= List of colonial governors of Madagascar =

French colonial governor of Madagascar
- Gouverneur colonial français de Madagascar
- Seal of the Government-General of Madagascar

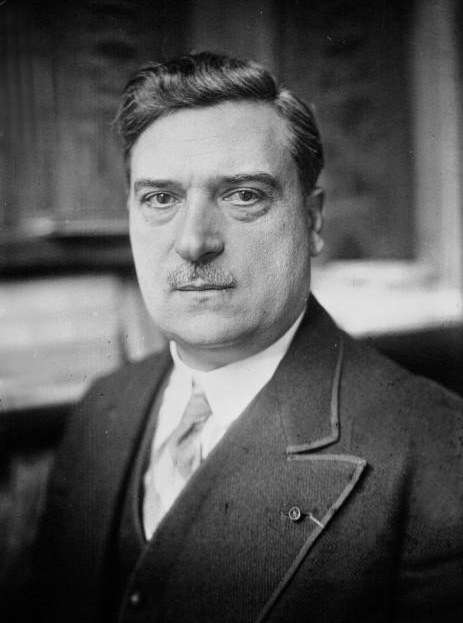
- Longest serving Léon Henri Charles Cayla; 1 May 1930 – 22 April 1939
- Reports to: Head of State of France
- Seat: Tananarive
- Formation: 28 April 1886
- First holder: Charles Le Myre de Vilers (as Plenipotentiary)
- Final holder: Jean Louis Marie André Soucadaux (as High Commissioner)
- Abolished: 1 May 1959

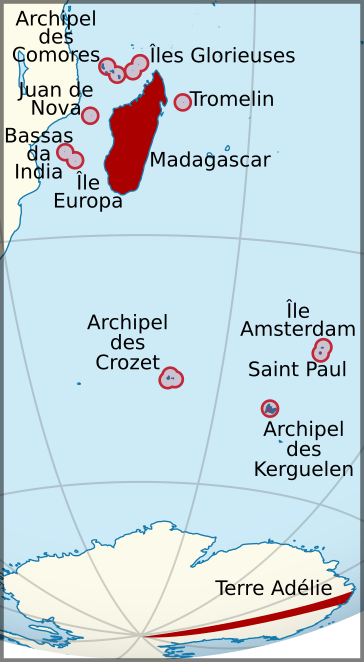
Colony of Madagascar and Dependencies, 1930.

In 1882, the French Third Republic established a protectorate over the Merina Kingdom on the island of Madagascar, with the consent of the United Kingdom (officially recognized by the UK per treaty in 1890). The French position on the island was solidified by the First Madagascar expedition (May 1883 to December 1885, the first phase of the Franco-Hova Wars). The protectorate lasted until 1897, when the French abolished the monarchy and turned the island into a colony, following the Second Madagascar expedition (December 1894 to September 1895, the second and last phase of the Franco-Hova Wars). Afterwards, Madagascar remained part of the French colonial empire until 1958, when the autonomous Malagasy Republic was established. The Republic gained full independence in 1960.

== List ==
(Dates in italics indicate de facto continuation of office)

Tenure	Incumbent	Notes	Portrait
Malagasy Protectorate (1882–1897)
28 April 1886 to March 1888	Charles Le Myre de Vilers, Plenipotentiary	1st term	
March 1888 to 12 December 1889	Paul Augustin Jean Larrouy, Resident-General	1st term	
12 December 1889 to 11 October 1891	Maurice Bompard, Resident-General		
11 October 1891 to October 1892	Jean Aurélien Lacoste, Acting Resident-General		
October 1892 to 8 September 1894	Paul Augustin Jean Larrouy, Resident-General	2nd term	
October 1894	Albert d'Anthouard de Waservas, Acting Resident-General		
14 October 1894 to 1 December 1895	Charles Le Myre de Vilers, Plenipotentiary	2nd time; served at the start of the Menalamba rebellion	
September 1894 to 21 February 1895	Achille Ranchot, Acting Resident-General	For de Vilers	
February 1895 to 1 December 1895	Robert Édouard Alphonse Chaloin, Acting Resident-General	For de Vilers	
1 December 1895 to 28 September 1896	Hippolyte Laroche, Resident-General		
28 September 1896 to 31 July 1897	Joseph Gallieni, Resident-General		
Colony of Madagascar and Dependencies (1897–1958)
6 August 1896 to 31 July 1897	Joseph Gallieni, Military Governor		
31 July 1897 to 11 May 1905	Joseph Gallieni, Governor-General	Served during the 1904–1905 uprising	
11 May 1905 to 1 January 1906	Charles Louis Lépreux, Acting Governor-General		
1 January 1906 to 13 December 1909	Victor Augagneur, Governor-General		
13 December 1909 to 16 January 1910	Hubert Auguste Garbit, Acting Governor-General	1st term	
16 January 1910 to 31 October 1910	Henri François Charles Cor, Acting Governor-General		
31 October 1910 to 5 August 1914	Albert Jean George Marie Louis Picquié, Governor-General		
5 August 1914 to 14 October 1914	Hubert Auguste Garbit, Acting Governor-General	2nd term	
14 October 1914 to 24 July 1917	Hubert Auguste Garbit, Governor-General	2nd term	
24 July 1917 to 1 August 1918	Martial Henri Merlin, Governor-General		
1 August 1918 to 12 July 1919	Abraham Schrameck, Governor-General		
12 July 1919 to 22 June 1920	Marie Casimir Joseph Guyon, Acting Governor-General		
22 June 1920 to 13 March 1923	Hubert Auguste Garbit, Governor-General	3rd term	
13 March 1923 to 20 February 1924	Auguste Charles Désiré Emmanuel Brunet, Acting Governor-General		
20 February 1924 to 30 January 1929	Marcel Achille Olivier, Governor-General		
30 January 1929 to 1 May 1930	Hugues Jean Berthier, Acting Governor-General		
1 May 1930 to 22 April 1939	Léon Henri Charles Cayla, Governor-General	1st term	
22 April 1939 to 10 June 1939	Léon Maurice Valentin Réallon, Acting Governor-General		
10 June 1939 to 30 July 1940	Jules Marcel de Coppet, Governor-General	1st term	
30 July 1940 to 11 April 1941	Léon Henri Charles Cayla, Governor-General	2nd term	
11 April 1941 to 30 September 1942	Armand Léon Annet, Governor-General	Deposed in the Battle of Madagascar	
5 May 1942 to 11 October 1942	Robert Sturges, Commander	British occupation	
11 October 1942 to 1945	Gerald Smallwood, Commander	British occupation	
25 September 1942 to 7 January 1943	Anthony Sillery, Occupied Territories Administrator	British occupation	
30 September 1942 to 7 January 1943	Victor Marius Bech, Acting Governor-General		
7 January 1943 to 3 May 1943	Paul Louis Victor Marie Legentilhomme, High Commissioner of Free French Possessions in the Indian Ocean		
3 May 1943 to 27 March 1946	Pierre de Saint-Mart, Governor-General		
27 March 1946 to 19 May 1946	Robert Boudry, Acting Governor-General		
19 May 1946 to 23 December 1947	Jules Marcel de Coppet, High Commissioner	2nd term; served at the start of the Malagasy Uprising	
February 1948 to 3 February 1950	Pierre Gabriel de Chevigné, High Commissioner		
3 February 1950 to October 1954	Robert Isaac Bargues, High Commissioner		
October 1954 to 1 May 1959	Jean Louis Marie André Soucadaux, High Commissioner		

== See also ==
- History of Madagascar
- Merina Kingdom
  - List of Imerina monarchs
- Malagasy Protectorate
- French Madagascar
- Franco-Hova Wars
- French colonial empire

== Sources ==
- http://www.rulers.org/rulm1.html#madagascar
- African States and Rulers, John Stewart, McFarland
- Heads of State and Government, 2nd Edition, John V da Graca, MacMillan Press (2000)
