= Cat Island (Antarctica) =

Island in Antarctica

Cat Island (65°47′S 65°13′W) is an island 0.5 nautical miles (0.9 km) long, lying midway between Duchaylard Island and Larrouy Island at the south end of Grandidier Channel. Discovered and named by the British Graham Land Expedition (BGLE), 1934-37, under Rymill.

== See also ==
- List of antarctic and sub-antarctic islands
