= Louis Lafont =

Louis Lafont may refer to:

- Ernest Lafont (Louis-Ernest Lafont, 1879–1946), French socialist politician
- Louis Charles Georges Jules Lafont (1825–1908), French naval officer

== See also ==
- Emmanuel Marie Philippe Louis Lafont (born 1945), French prelate of the Catholic Church
