= Dog Island (Antarctica) =

Island in Antarctica

Dog Island (65°49′S 65°5′W) is the northernmost of the Llanquihue Islands, off the west coast of Graham Land. Charted by the British Graham Land Expedition (BGLE) under Rymill, 1934–37. So named by the United Kingdom Antarctic Place-Names Committee (UK-APC) in 1959 because the island faces Cat Island across the navigable channel.

== See also ==
- List of antarctic and sub-antarctic islands
