= Llanquihue Islands =

Islands on the coast of Graham, Antarctica

The Llanquihue Islands (65°53′S 65°6′W) are a group of islands to the east of Larrouy Island, extending northward for 9 nautical miles (17 km) from the west coast of Graham Land, Antarctica. They were charted by the British Graham Land Expedition under John Rymill, 1934–37. The name appears on a Chilean government chart of 1947 and is after Llanquihue Province in Chile.

The northernmost island is Dog Island.

== See also ==
- List of Antarctic and sub-Antarctic islands
