= Paul Augustin Jean Larrouy =

French diplomat

Paul Augustin Jean Larrouy was a French diplomat born in Lagardelle-sur-Leze in France on 1 January 1857 and who died in Buenos Aires on 10 August 1906. Notably, he has been Résident Général in second in Madagascar from March 1888 until 12 December 1889, and in his second term Résident Général in Madagascar from October 1892 until 1894.

== Action in Madagascar ==
Paul Augustin Jean Larrouy's role during his second stay in Madagascar as General Resident was to maintain the French Authority without losing face in front of a non-abiding Malagasy power supported by England. The Malagasy government was confronted to a Menalamba revolt against the agreements signed with France in 1885 by the queen Ranavalona III. He leaves Tananarive at his request in 1894, and is succeeded by Charles Le Myre de Vilers. After the stay of the later, France decides a complete annexation of Madagascar in 1896 and call General Joseph Gallieni as Resident and First Madagascar governor

== Assignments ==
After graduating with a law degree (doctorat de Droit) Paul Augustin Jean Larrouy has had a very rich diplomatic career started in 1873 as chancery clerk in Buenos Aires and finished in Buenos Aires as Ambassador and Plenipotentiary Minister. He climbed the ladder following his various assignments in South America, in Europe, in Asia, and in Africa. He is sent in Japan (Yokohama) in 1882 and is secretary to the International conference for revision of Treaties with Japan.

In Africa he performed several missions related to the French Colonial expansion: In Sub-Saharan Africa, (Envoy of the French Government to the conference related to the delimitation of French and English spheres of influence in the Niger region in February 1896), and in Madagascar, starting 17 August 1887 as a Résident Général in second then from 19 August 1892 as Résident Général in Tananarive to the Queen Ranavalona III.

While in Argentina as Extraordinary envoy and plenipotentiary minister in his last rotation, he met Jean-Baptiste Charcot who was preparing his expedition to Antarctica between 1903 and 1905. He became one of the sponsor of the expedition. Charcot gave his name to Larrouy Island, a newly found island located at 65°52′S 65°15′W.

From	Until	Where	What
12 December 1873	1875	Buenos Aires Argentina	Chancery clerk
15 October 1875		Leipzig Germany	Chancery Manager
14 September 1876		Leipzig Germany	3rd class Chancellor
17 July 1880		Odessa Russia	Chancellor (non-resident)
12 August 1880		Yokohama Japan	2nd class Chancellor
15 January 1882	1 August 1882	Yokohama Japan	Secretary to the International conference for the revision to the treaties with Japan
15 June 1883		Caracas Venezuela	1st class Chancellor (non-resident)
17 August 1887	1889	Madagascar	Résident Général Adjoint
18 April 1889	1891	Messina Italy	Consul
12 January 1891	1892	Dublin Ireland	Consul
19 August 1892	1895	Tananarive Madagascar	General Resident
1 February 1896			Representative of the French government to the conference related on the limit of the French and English spheres of influence in the Niger region
1900	1902	Lima Peru	Ambassador
June 1903	July 1904	Madrid – Paris	President of the French Delegation to the international commission for the French-Pyrenean railways and delegate of foreign affairs to the French-Spanish evaluation commission of projects for railways through the Pyrenees
31 December 1904	1906	Buenos Aires Argentina	Extraordinary envoy and plenipotentiary minister
