= Louis Charles Georges Jules Lafont =

French naval officer

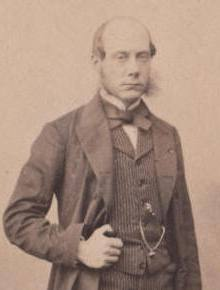
- Lafont c. 1860 by Gustave Le Gray

Governor of Cochinchina
- In office 16 October 1877 – 7 July 1879
- President: Patrice de MacMahon; Jules Grévy
- Preceded by: Victor Auguste, baron Duperré
- Succeeded by: Charles Le Myre de Vilers

Personal details
- Born: 24 April 1825 Fort-de-France, Martinique, France
- Died: 31 January 1908 (aged 82) Paris, France
- Occupation: Naval officer

Louis Charles Georges Jules Lafont (24 April 1825 – 31 January 1908) was a French naval officer who was Governor of Cochinchina from 1877 to 1879. He joined the navy at the age of sixteen, rose steadily through the ranks, and served in Vietnam, the Philippines, West Africa, the Crimea, the Baltic, the Indian Ocean, China and East Africa. During the Franco-Prussian War of 1870–71 he was given command of land troops. After returning from Cochinchina he held various senior naval commands, including commander in chief of the training squadron from 1885 to 1886.

== Early years (1825–47) ==
Louis Charles Georges Jules Lafont was born on 24 April 1825 in Fort-de-France, Martinique. His parents were Jacques Charles Lafont (1768–1839), a merchant, and Elisabeth Perriquet (1795–1871). He joined the navy when he was sixteen. He became an aspirant (midshipman) on 1 September 1843 in Toulon. He served on the Victorieuse during a long campaign in the Far East. He distinguished himself in the attack on Tourane (Da Nang), and then in an expedition against the pirates of Basilan in the Philippines.

== Ensign and lieutenant (1847–59) ==
Lafonte was made enseigne de vaisseau (ensign) on 1 September 1847, and returned to France in 1848 after the Victorieuse sank in Korea. In May 1849 he was on the Agile stationed on the west coast of Africa. He was made a Knight of the Legion of Honour on 10 December 1850. Lafont was assigned to the depot of maps and plans in October 1850. He was promoted to lieutenant de vaisseau (lieutenant) on 1 July 1852. In May 1853 he was serving on the Iéna in the training squadron. From October 1853 on the Jupiter he took part in the operations of the Crimean War. He distinguished himself in the attack on Sevastopol on 17 October 1854.

In May 1855 Lafont was in command of the gunboat Poudre in the Baltic, and took part in the attack on Sveaborg. In May 1856 he was in command of the Salve in Cherbourg, and then of the gunboat Avalanche in the Indian Ocean. Lafont was active part in the campaign led by Charles Rigault de Genouilly in China and Indochina, and participated in the Battle of Canton (1857), the Battle of Taku Forts (1859), the Siege of Tourane (1858–1860) and the Capture of Saigon (February 1859). He was promoted to Officer of the Legion of Honour on 28 August 1858. In 1859 Lafont was an aide-de-camp to Rigault de Genouilly in Da Nang.

== Captain and admiral (1859–77) ==
Lafont was promoted to capitaine de frégate (frigate captain) on 19 November 1859. He returned to France, where he was assigned to the Hydrographic Committee. On 24 July 1860 he married Marie Goffart (1837–1903) in Valenciennes. Their children included Charles (1861–1956), Elisabeth Suzanne (1862–1946), Anne (1866–1954) and Marguerite (1871–1947).

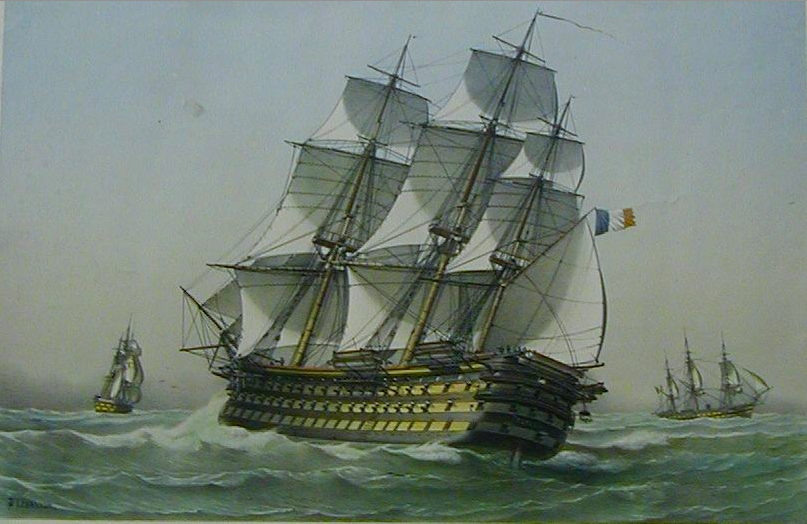
French ship Bretagne (1855)

In January 1862 Lafont was again aide-de-camp of Admiral Rigault de Genouilly, commander of the training squadron. on the Bretagne, then on the Ville de Paris. In April 1863 he took command of the aviso Caton. He was second in command of the imperial yacht Aigle in July 1865. On 6 April 1867 he was promoted to capitaine de vaisseau (ship captain). From 1868 to 1870 Lafont commanded the ironclad Héroïne in the training squadron, flagship of Albert Gicquel des Touches.

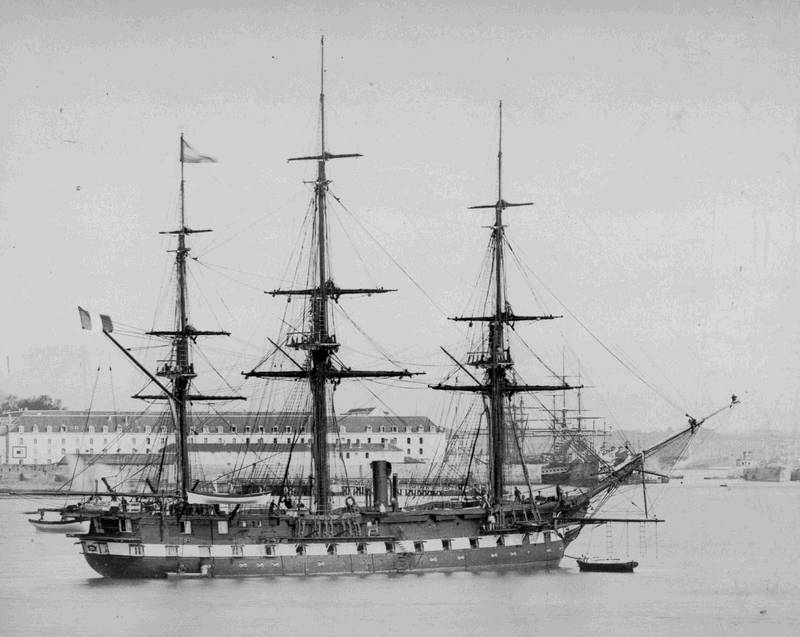
Steam frigate Clorinde

During the Franco-Prussian War in July 1870 Lafont took command of the Armid in the Baltic during the blockade of the Prussian coast. In October 1870 he was assigned to the army as brigadier general in command of the subdivision of Aube. He fought at Nogent-sur-Seine, and in November was given command of Ille-et-Vilaine. He was made Commander of the Legion of Honour on 2 July 1871. In May 1871 Lafont was a member of the Marine Works Council. In June 1873 he commanded the frigate Clorinde on the east coast of Africa. He was promoted to contre-amiral (rear admiral) on 3 August 1875. He was made Major General of the 1st maritime district in Cherbourg. In July 1876 he was President of the High Committee on Underwater Defenses.

== Governor of Cochinchina (1877–79) ==
Lafont was governor of Cochinchina from 16 October 1877 to 7 July 1879. He succeeded Victor Auguste, baron Duperré, and was the last naval officer to serve as governor. He was also commander in chief of the Naval Station in Saigon. His flagship was the Tilsitt.

In January the USS Monocacy under Commander Sumner visited Saigon, where the officers were invited to a grand ball at the governor's palace. At the time Lafont's flagship was the old line battleship Tilsitt, and the other naval vessels were the Antelope, a small paddle steamer, a troopship and about a dozen 60 feet (18 m) long riverboats. These drew 3 feet (0.91 m), steamed at 10 knots (19 km/h; 12 mph) and were armed with a six-inch breech loading rifle. The huge arsenal was under construction and contained an ordnance yard, coal depot and dock yard with six to eight large buildings including a working foundry, forge and machine shop. There was an iron floating dry dock that could raise a fully loaded frigate.

Lafont set out to make the system of taxation fairer and less burdensome to small landowners, many of whom had not registered their land. He reduced land property taxes but added a tax on rice exports, which affected only the largest landowners, and as a result made some powerful enemies. He confirmed the Catholic Church's property titles, for which he earned the thanks of Bishop Isidore Colombert. He tried to prevent direct dealings between the Vietnamese and the Chinese.

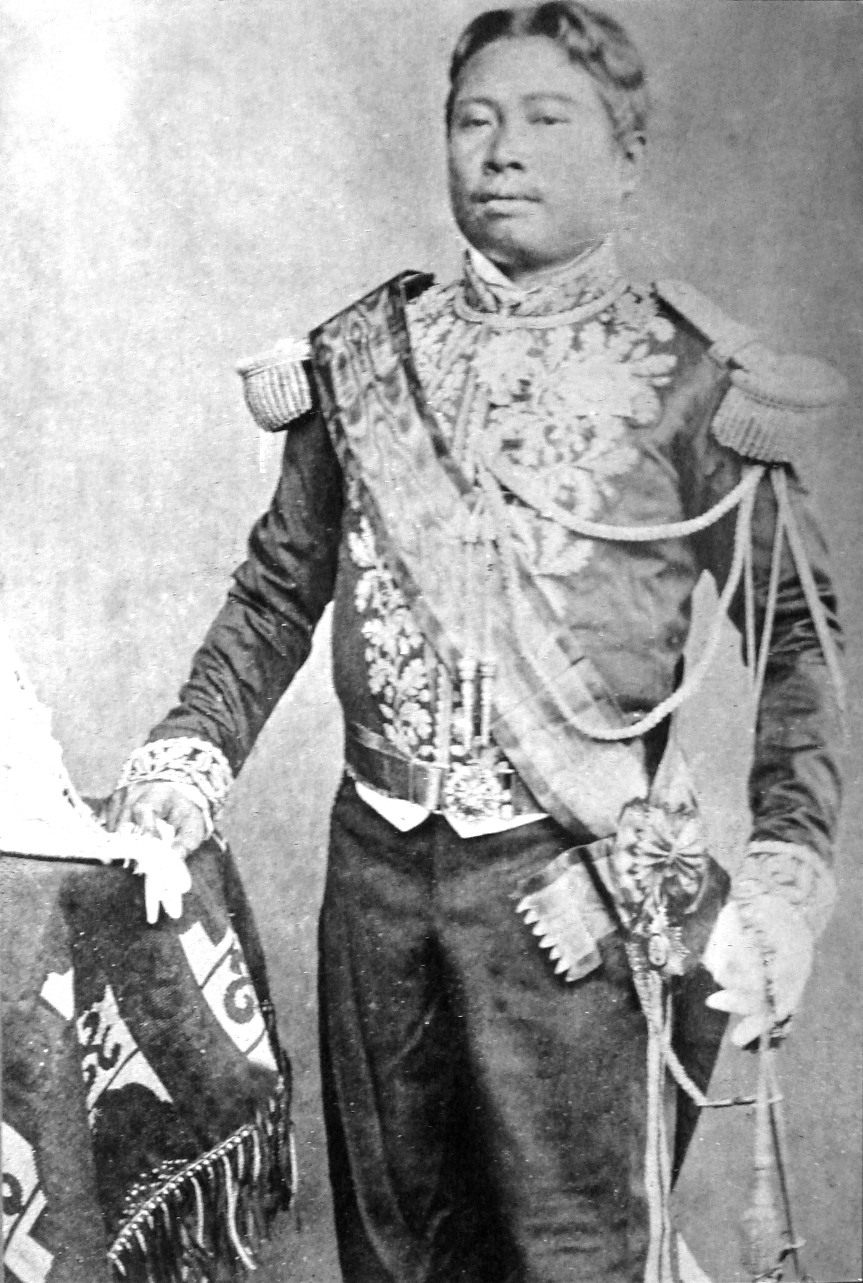
King Norodom

Lafont as governor of Cochinchina had overall responsibility for the protectorate of Cambodia, which was poorly governed by King Norodom of Cambodia. Under pressure from the French a royal decree of 1877 introduced administrative reforms, but little was done to put them into effect. Lafont wrote to the king asking him to implement the reforms. He wrote, "Many individuals, being implicated in theft, insolvency and even crime, get themselves issued with documents from senior mandarins, Princes, and even Your Majesty's wives, certifying to no-one is entitled to pursue them without having first obtained the prior authorization of the Protectorate ... This state of affairs is not compatible with justice in a civilized country." Lafont's complaint was ignored.

Lafont was replaced as governor in July 1879 by Charles Le Myre de Vilers.

== Later career (1879–1908) ==
On 1 April 1880 Lafont was appointed deputy commander of the training squadron under Vice-Admiral Henri Garnault^{(fr)} with the battleship Suffren as his flagship. He was promoted to vice-amiral on 24 February 1881. In February 1882 he was prefect of the 2nd maritime district at Brest. Lafont was maritime prefect of Brest from 15 February 1882 to 15 October 1885. He was made a Grand Officer of the Legion of Honour on 8 July 1884. On 20 October 1885 he was appointed commander in chief of the training squadron. In November 1886 he was appointed Chairman of the Marine Works Council. Lafont was awarded the Grand Cross of the Legion of Honour on 9 July 1889.

Lafont retired from active service in April 1890 at the age of 65. On 4 December 1894 he was made president of central council that raised money for a hospital ship to be sent to the fishermen off Iceland and Newfoundland. The response was good, and the Saint-Pierre was ordered for the 1896 season. A land-based abri des marins was set up in Saint-Pierre to provide an alternative to drinking places for seamen while on shore. Lafont died on 31 January 1908 in Paris. He is buried in the 25th division of Père Lachaise Cemetery.

== Sources ==
- Army and Navy Journal (6 April 1878), The United States Army and Navy Journal and Gazette of the Regular and Volunteer Forces
- Corfield, Justin (2014-11-01), Historical Dictionary of Ho Chi Minh City, Anthem Press, ISBN 978-1-78308-333-6
- Fielding, Leslie (2008), Before the Killing Fields: Witness to Cambodia and the Vietnam War, I.B.Tauris, ISBN 978-1-84511-493-0
- Garric, Alain, "Louis Charles Georges Jules LAFONT Le Vice-Amiral", Geneanet (in French)
- LAFONT Louis Charles (1825-1908) (in French), APPL: Association des Amis et Passionnés du Père-Lachaise
- "LAFONT, Louis Charles Georges", Leonore (in French), Archives nationales
- "Louis Charles Georges Jules LAFONT", Ecole Navale (in French)
- Louis Charles Georges Jules Lafont (in French), SMLH29n: Société des Membres de la Légion d'Honneur Finistère Nord
- Miller, R.W.H (2012-10-25), One Firm Anchor: The Church and the Merchant Seafarer, an Introductory History, James Clarke & Co, ISBN 978-0-7188-9290-6
- Rouxel, Jean-Christophe, "Louis Charles Georges Jules LAFONT", Ecole navale (in French)
