= Grandidier Channel =

Strait in Antarctica

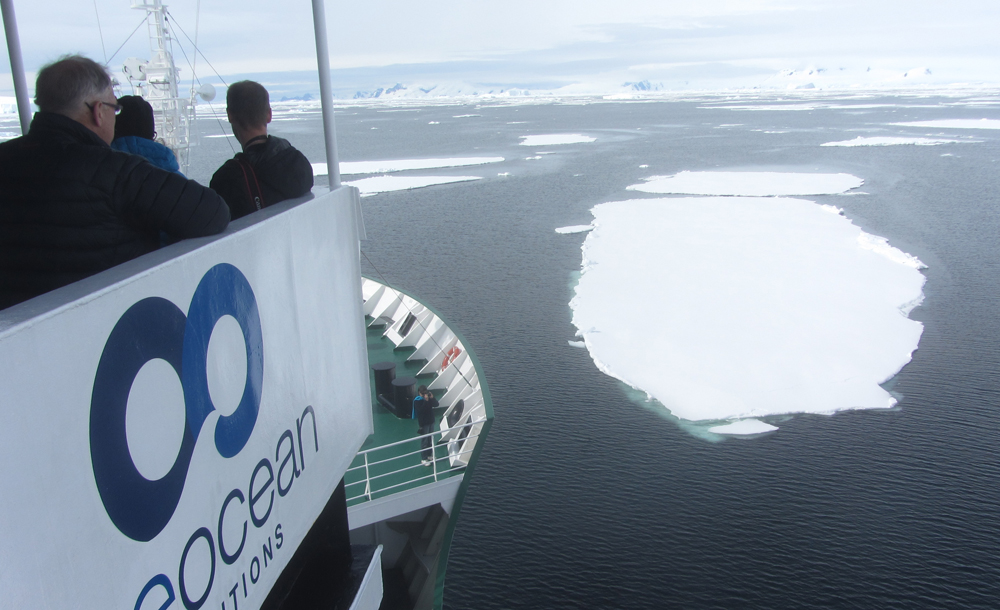
Akademik Ioffe cruises Grandidier Channel in January 2014

Grandidier Channel (65°35′S 64°45′W) is a navigable channel between the west coast of Graham Land, Antarctica, and the north end of the Biscoe Islands, extending from Penola Strait southwestward to the vicinity of Larrouy Island. It was first charted by the French Antarctic Expedition, 1903–05, and named by Jean-Baptiste Charcot for Alfred Grandidier, President of the Paris Geographical Society. Charcot applied the name to the entire body of water between the mainland and the Biscoe Islands but the name has since been restricted to the navigable portion described.

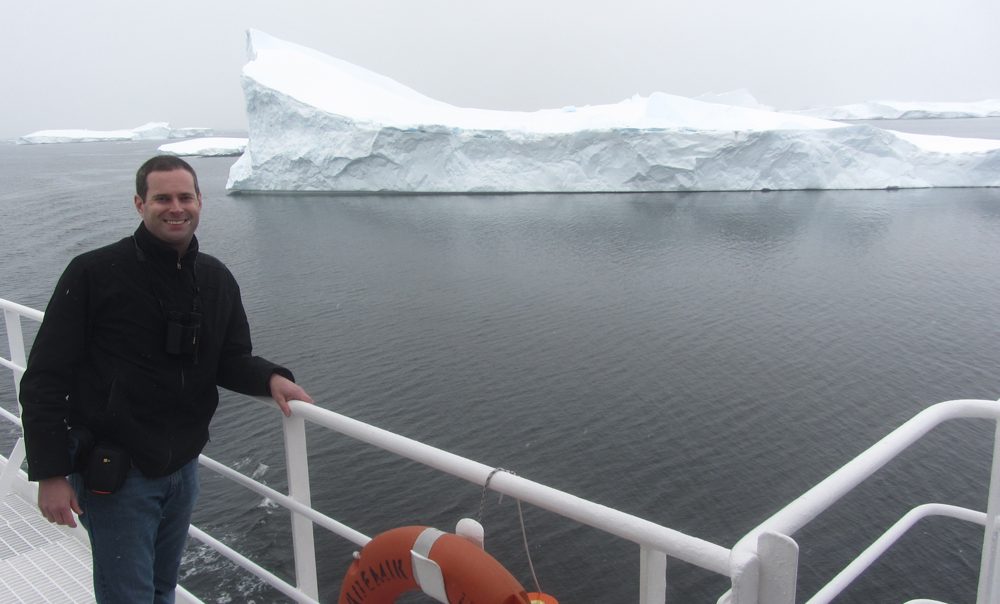
Cruising Grandidier Channel in January 2014

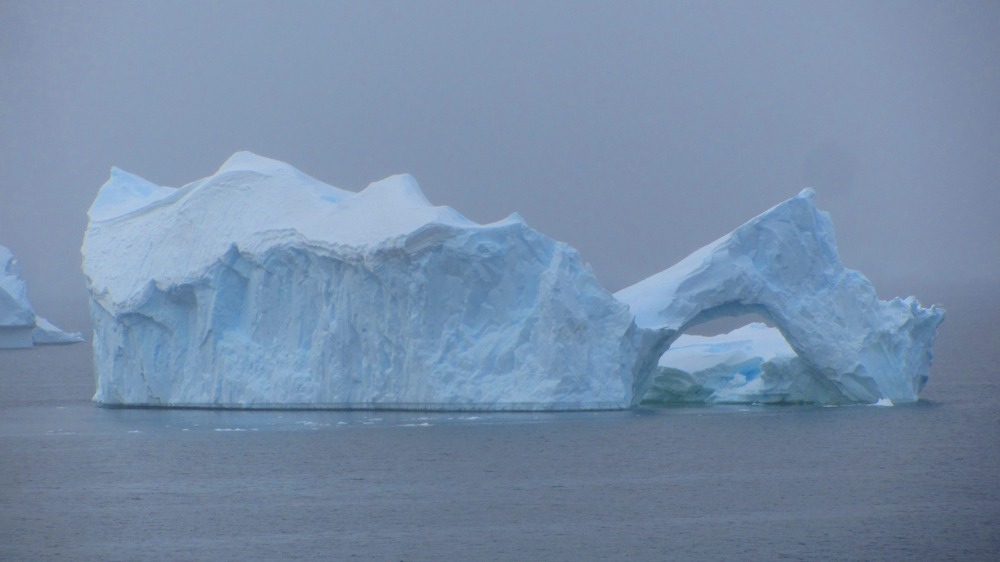
Iceberg in Grandidier Channel

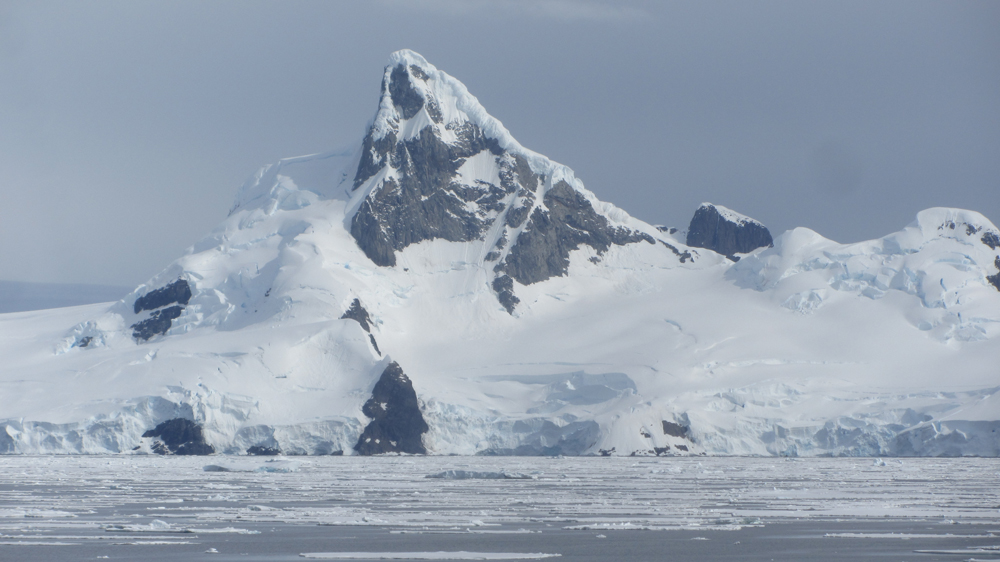
Grandidier Channel

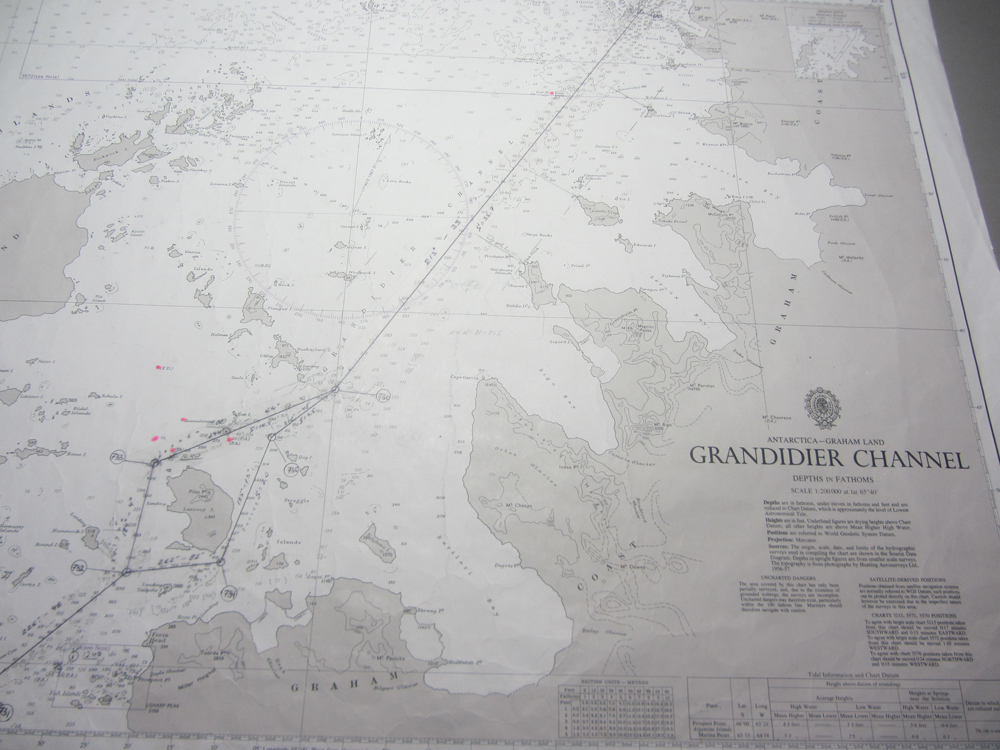
Nautical chart of Grandidier Channel

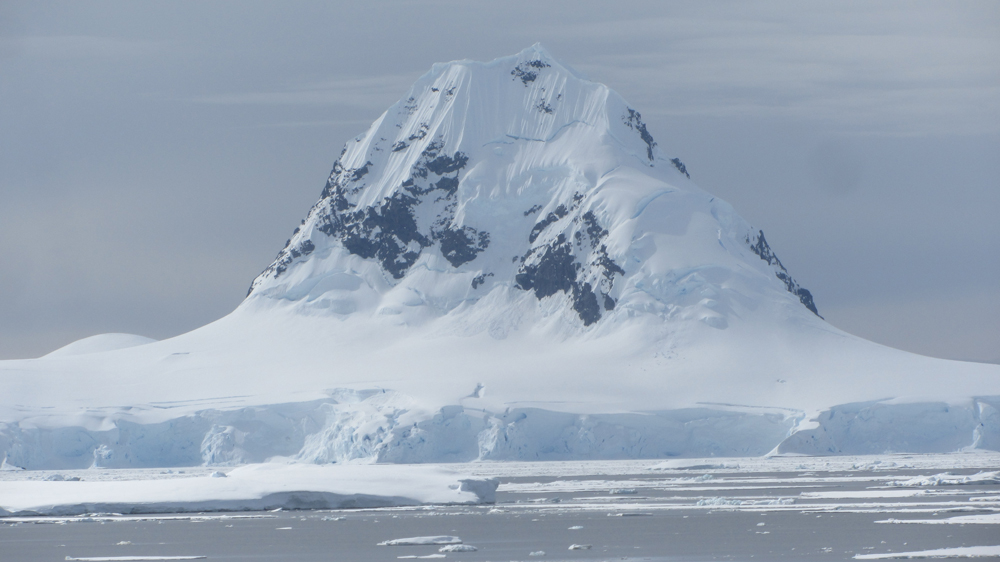
Grandidier Channel

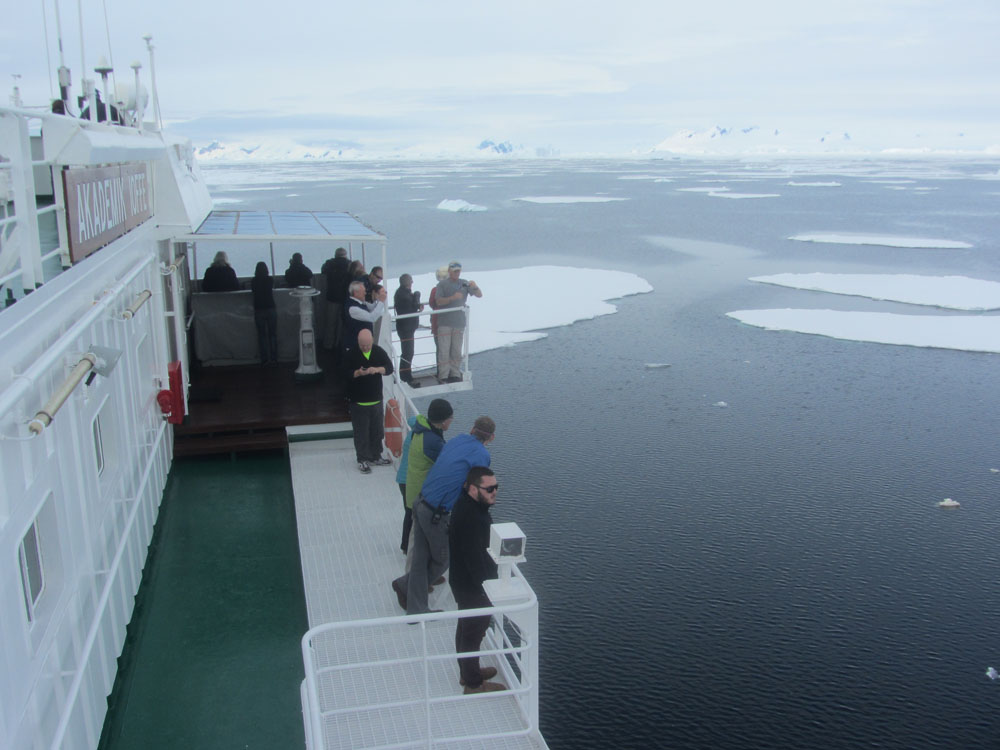
Akademik Ioffe cruises Grandidier Channel in January 2014

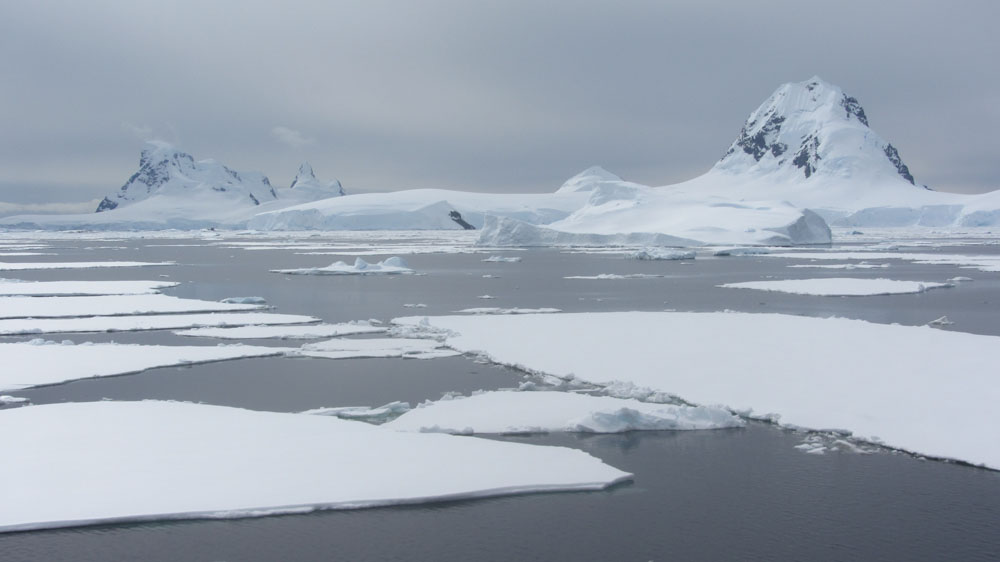
Grandidier Channel in January 2014

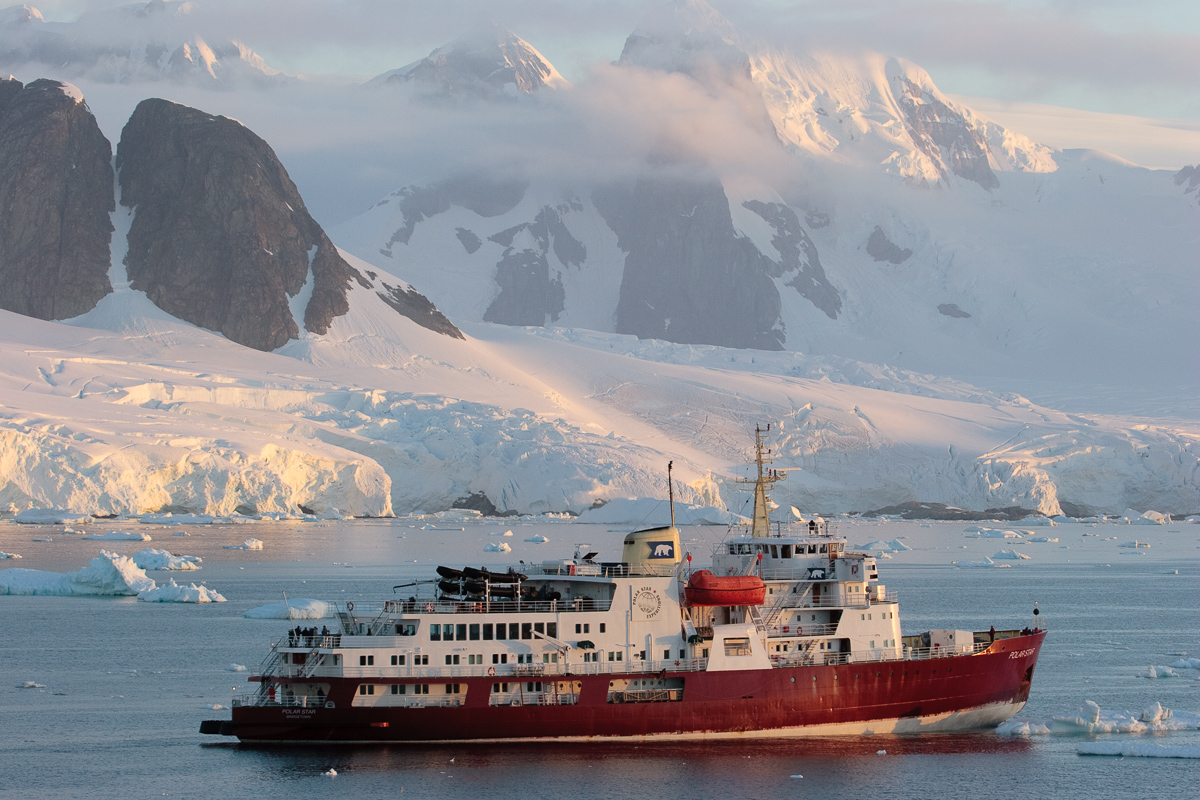
MV Polar Star in Grandidier Channel, 2006
