= Larrouy Island =

Island in Graham Land, Antarctica

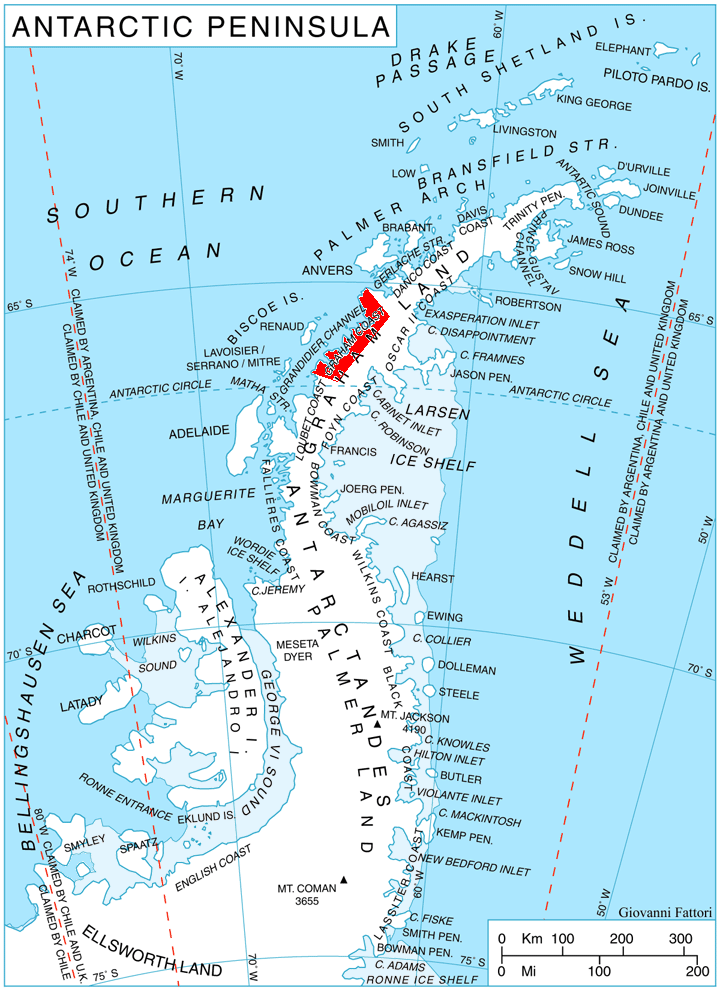
- Location of Graham Coast on the Antarctic Peninsula

- Location within Antarctica

Geography
- Location: Antarctica
- Coordinates: 65°52′S 65°15′W
- Highest elevation: 175 m (574 ft)

Administration
- Administered under the Antarctic Treaty System

Demographics
- Population: Uninhabited

Larrouy Island is an island 9 kilometres (5 nmi) long and 4 kilometres (2 nmi) wide which rises to 745 metres (2,440 ft) at Peak Pilot. It lies in the Grandidier Channel off the northwest coast of Velingrad Peninsula 7 kilometres (4 nmi) north of Ferin Head, Antarctica. It was discovered by the French Antarctic Expedition, 1903–05, under Jean-Baptiste Charcot, who named it for Paul Augustin Jean Larrouy, at that time a French Minister Plenipotentiary.

== See also ==
- List of Antarctic and sub-Antarctic islands
