= Franco-Hova Wars =

1883–1896 French colonial invasions of Madagascar

- Part of the French colonial wars
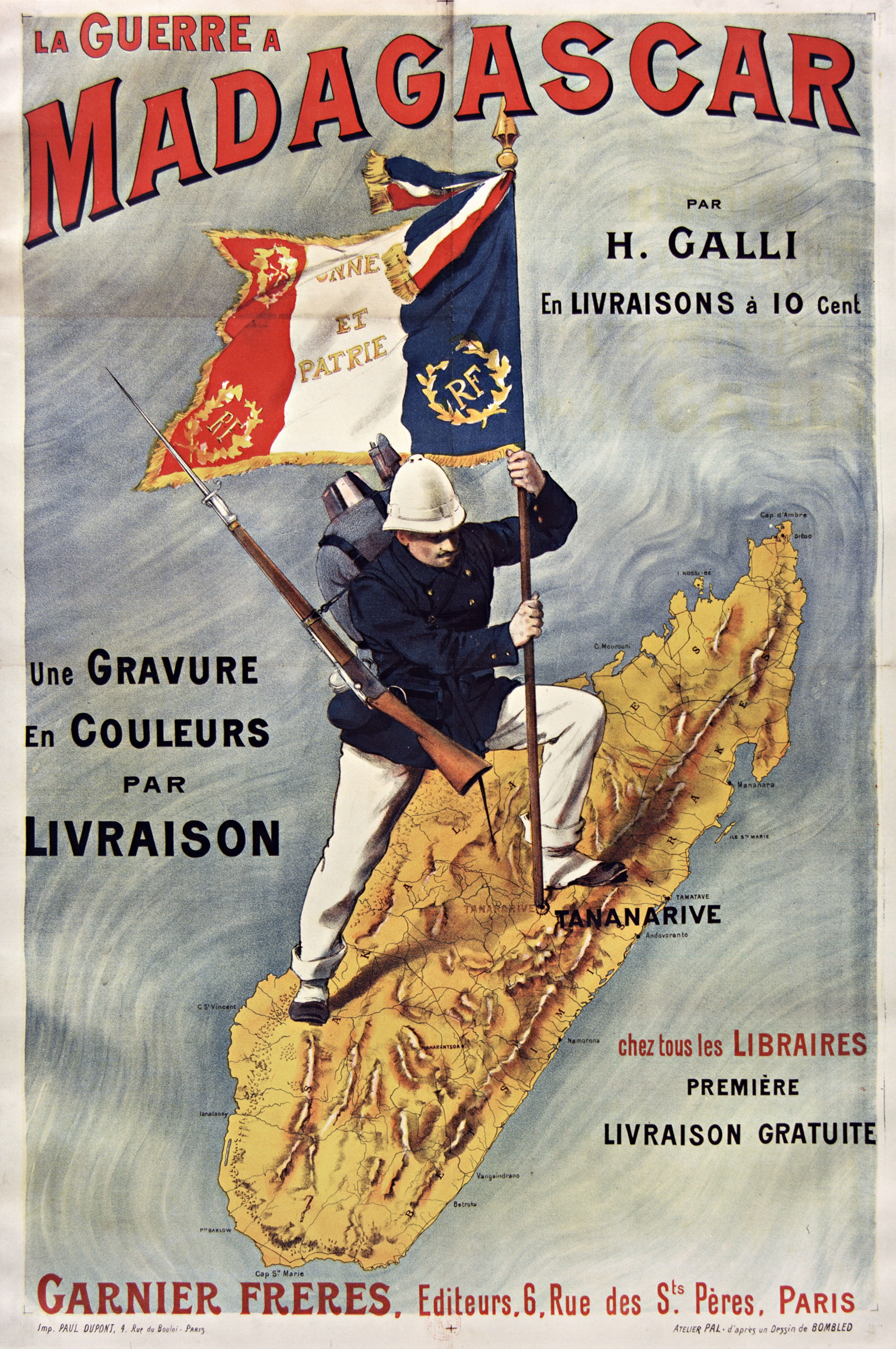
- French poster about the "Madagascar War"
Date	December 1883 – September 1895
Location	Madagascar
Result	French victory: Establishment of the Malagasy Protectorate

Belligerents
France	Merina Kingdom

Commanders and leaders
(France) Jacques Duchesne (France) Léon Frédéric Hubert Metzinger	Ranavalona II; Ranavalona III; Rainilaiarivony

The Franco-Hova Wars, also known as the Franco-Malagasy Wars, were two French military interventions in Madagascar between 1883 and 1896 that overthrew the ruling monarchy of the Merina Kingdom, and resulted in Madagascar becoming a French colony. The term "Hova" referred to a social class within the Merina class structure.

== Background ==
Beginning with the arrival of European powers to Madagascar, the United Kingdom and France both developed ambitions to control Madagascar, a rich island with strategic importance in regard to the sea passage to India. Despite this, the Merina Kingdom of Madagascar had steadfastly managed to maintain its independence during the 19th century. Defense of the island was aided by its size and diversity of terrain, the nation's organized military and government structures, and the prevalence of tropical diseases, which often proved deadly to Europeans. The first significant European influence in Imerina was the arrival of a handful of British missionaries in the capital of Antananarivo in 1820 during the reign of Radama I, who invited them to establish schools and teach the Merina free populace how to read. Several years into the reign of Queen Ranavalona I, which began in 1828, the monarchy became increasingly disapproving of the growing popularity of the Christianity that the missionaries had introduced, and encouraged them to cease teaching religion while continuing to provide technical and vocational training to create a cadre of skilled craftsmen. She successfully repelled French attacks on Foulepointe and other coastal cities. During several periods, Ranavalona's restrictions on the practice of Christianity minimized European presence on the island.

Upon Ranavalona's death, her son succeeded her as King Radama II in 1861. As prince, he had already made concessions to Joseph-François Lambert, a Frenchman who had resided at Ranavalona's court and assisted in the development of numerous resources. The Lambert Charter Radama had approved conceded significant tracts of land to Lambert in neglect of the island-wide significance attached to ancestral land. In addition, the French government received a letter purportedly written by the prince, requesting French military aid to depose his mother. The origins and authenticity of the letter are disputed, and the British alleged that it was crafted by Jean Laborde (particularly since it was written in French, a language Radama did not know how to write in) to support French military intervention on the island.

After a brief reign, Radama was strangled in an 1863 coup d'etat termed the Aristocratic Revolution. Radama's widow Rasoherina was placed on the throne by Prime Minister Rainivoninahitriniony and his cabinet on the condition that the absolute power of the monarch was ended and the majority of power over day-to-day governance and foreign affairs rested with the Prime Minister. The despotism of the prime minister led him to be replaced by his younger brother, Rainilaiarivony, who would govern Madagascar for 30 years until the capture of Antananarivo by the French military. Rainilaiarivony and successive queens Ranavalona II and Ranavalona III sought to maintain the sovereignty of Madagascar. The Merina monarchy revoked the terms of the Lambert Charter, explaining that the agreement was void because Malagasy territory belonged to the crown and the prince had not had the right to give it away while Ranavalona reigned. The heirs of Laborde, upon being refused right to the land they had been promised and the various properties owned by their father, pressed the claim with the government of France, providing a pretext for invasion on the basis of enforcing the legal rights of a French citizen.

The Merina monarchy vigorously attempted to resolve the issue through negotiation and diplomacy, relying heavily on the support of their British and American trading partners. They sent ambassadors to England and France to resolve the claims, but the French government refused to accept anything less than the full terms of the treaty. This provided the necessary pretext for a French military invasion of the island, which took place in two waves between 1883 and 1895.

== First Franco-Hova War ==
France invaded Madagascar in 1883, in what became known as the first Franco-Hova War, seeking to restore the cancelled concessions. With the signing of the Treaty of Tamatave in December 17, 1885, the war ceased. Madagascar ceded Antsiranana (Diego-Suarez) on the northern coast to France and paid a hefty fine of 10 million francs. The treaty included an 'Instructive Letter' which was to clarify the treaty, but which was never presented in the French Parliament when they voted to ratify the treaty. The treaty essentially gave France control over Malagasy foreign policy, and the French government used this to exert increasing control over the territory, but a Protectorate was not formally declared.

== Second Franco-Hova War ==
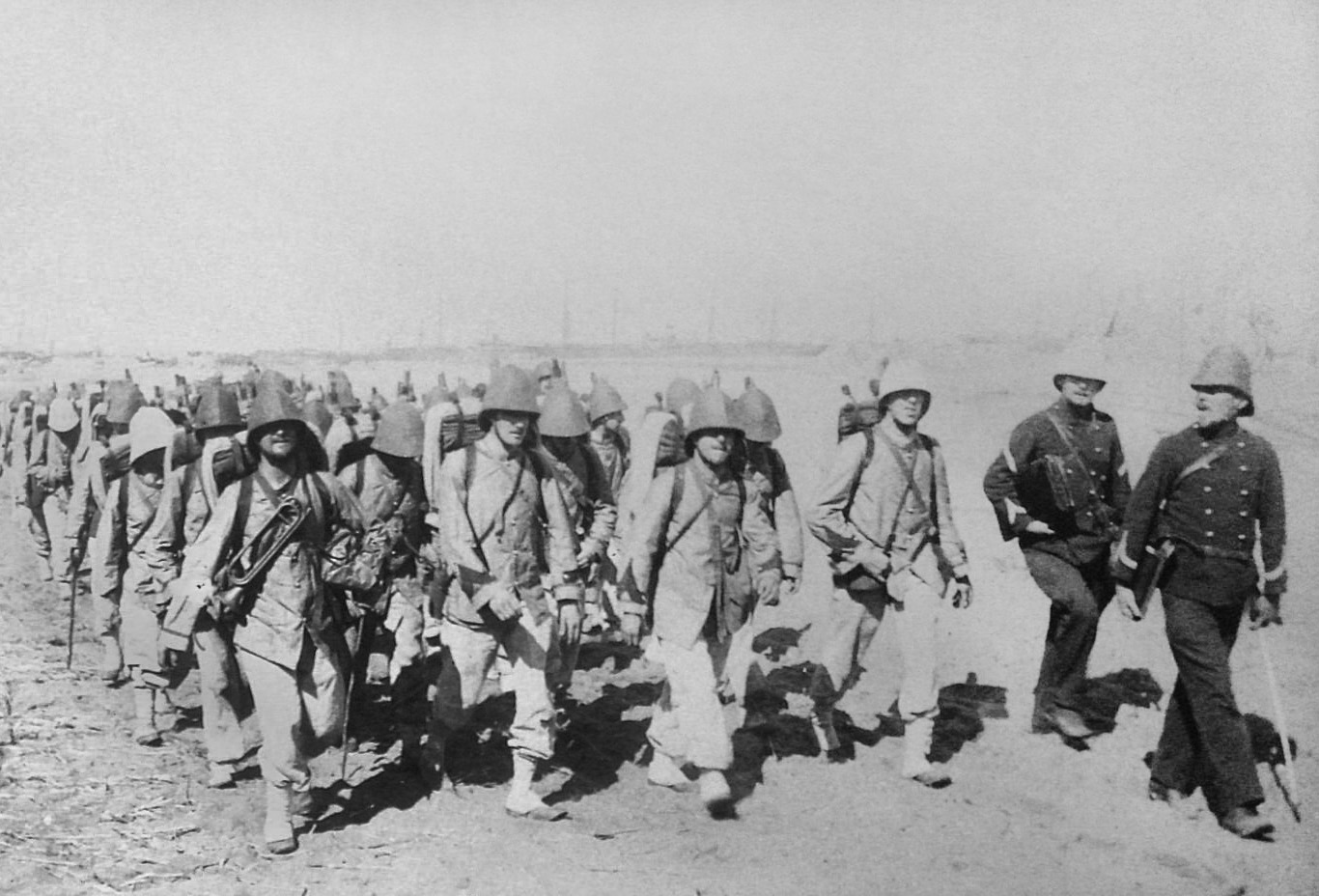
French infantry land at Majunga, May 1895

The terms and impositions of the treaty were not fully agreed by Rainilaiarivony. The situation quickly changed when the British recognized a French Protectorate of Madagascar in September 1890, in return for eventual British control over Zanzibar and as part of an overall definition of spheres of influence in Africa. With the opening of the Suez Canal, the strategic significance of Madagascar had declined. Rainilaiarivony prepared to defend the island from French military invasion by sending Colonel Shervinton, his European military adviser, to purchase arms in Europe. The French administration was determined to bring about a full Protectorate on the island, and thus evacuated its nonessential citizens from the region. Active hostilities commenced on December 12, 1894, when the French marines took possession of Tamatave. General Duchesne and his flying column landed in Mahajanga (Majunga) and marched to the capital, Antananarivo, hampered by the jungle, shallow river, disease, and lack of roads. They finally reached the city and began the assault in the last week of September 1895.

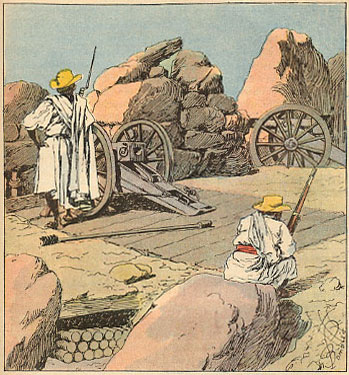
Merina artillery during the second war, 1896

The defenders were stationed on the main road to the capital, to the south of the city. The French commander circled Antananarivo and executed a feint attack on the north of the city. His main force attacked the east of the city, commanding a hillock from which he could shell the main government buildings, including the Queen's palace. Three shells were fired against the city, and the Hova army was routed. General Duchesne entered the city on October 1, and Queen Ranavalona III signed the treaty that made Madagascar a full Protectorate of the French government. The Merina Kingdom was put under French protection in 1896, overseen by the first Resident-General, Laroche.

Twenty French soldiers died fighting and 6,000 died of malaria and other diseases before the second Franco-Hova War ended.

== End of the Merina monarchy ==
Ranavalona and her cabinet were initially allowed to remain in government as ceremonial figureheads. French rule was challenged from the very moment of the capital's capture by a popular uprising termed the Menalamba rebellion. The fighting was led by commoners, principally from Imerina, who rejected not only French rule but Christianity and the influence of Europeans among the Merina rulers. The rebellion was put down with difficulty by General Gallieni over a year later. The French government determined that a civil governor was incapable of ensuring order and submission of the Malagasy people, and so deposed the queen in 1897, dissolved the 103-year-old Merina monarchy, and installed a military government headed by Gallieni. Queen Ranavalona III was exiled to Réunion and later to Algeria, where she died in 1917 without ever being allowed to return to Madagascar.

In August 2025, the skull of King Toera of Menabe, who was killed by French colonial soldiers during a battle in 1897, was returned to Malagasy officials along with the skulls of two of his companions by France, where they had been stored at the National Museum of Natural History in Paris. The skulls were returned to Madagascar and interred at a mausoleum in Antananarivo in September.

== Sources ==
- The Quarterly Review, Vol. 184, pgs. 246-269
