= Christianity in Madagascar =

As of 2020, Christianity is practiced by 85.3% of Madagascar's population, according to the Pew Research Center. However, other surveys put the figure at 58%. Malagasy Christianity is generally practised in syncretic form with traditional religious practices.

== Background ==
Protestantism was introduced by the first envoys of the London Missionary Society in 1818, who proselytized and taught literacy through a Malagasy language Bible at the public schools they established in the highlands at the request of King Radama I. The number of converts remained low but gradually grew under repression during the reign of his successor, Queen Ranavalona I, and the more permissive religious policies of her son, Radama II, and his widow, Queen Rasoherina.

The spread of Protestantism among the Merina upper classes by the mid-19th century, including Queen Ranavalona II, coupled with the growing political influence of the British missionaries, led Prime Minister Rainilaiarivony to legislate the conversion of the royal court. This prompted widespread popular conversion to Protestantism throughout the highlands in the late 19th century.

Catholicism was introduced principally through French diplomats and missionaries beginning in the mid-19th century but only gained significant converts under French colonization of Madagascar beginning in 1896. The early spread of Protestantism among the Merina elite resulted in a degree of class and ethnic differentiation among practitioners of Christianity, with the association of Protestantism with the upper classes and Merina ethnic group, and Catholicism attracting more adherents among the popular classes and coastal regions. Practitioners of Protestantism slightly outnumber adherents to Catholicism.

== History ==
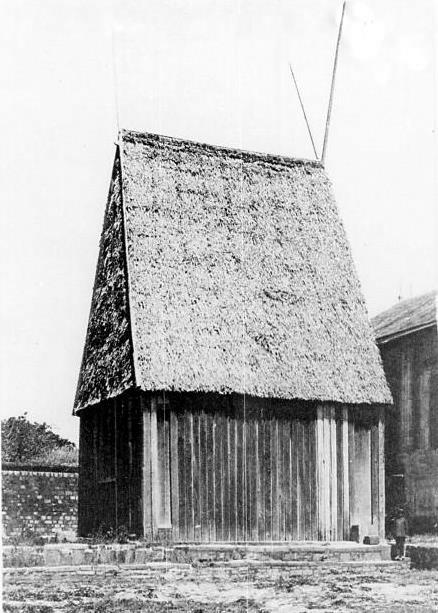
Besakana, site of the original Palace School on the Rova compound of Antananarivo

=== Initial spread ===
Portuguese and French began the first Christianization of Madagascar during the 17th century. They preached in the southeastern parts of the country. The Antanosy prince Andriandramaka is the first known Malagasy receiving baptism. The first formal European-style school was established in 1818 on the east coast of Madagascar at Toamasina by members of the London Missionary Society (LMS). King Radama I, the first sovereign to bring about half the island of Madagascar under his rule, was interested in strengthening ties with European powers; to this end, he invited LMS missionaries to open a school in his capital at Antananarivo within the Rova palace compound to instruct the royal family in literacy, numeracy and basic education. This first school, known as the Palace School, was established by LMS missionary David Jones on 8 December 1820 within Besakana, a Rova building of great historic and cultural significance. Within months, classes were transferred to a larger, purpose-built structure on the Rova grounds.

Beginning in December 1820, LMS missionaries established workshops in Antananarivo to teach trades and technical skills, and developed a network of public schools. By 1822, LMS missionaries had successfully transcribed the Merina dialect of the Malagasy language using the Latin alphabet. This dialect, spoken in the central highlands around Antananarivo, was declared the official version of the Malagasy language that year – a status that the highlands dialect has retained ever since. The Bible, which was incrementally translated into this dialect and printed on a press, was the first book printed in the Malagasy language and became the standard text used to teach literacy.

Convinced that Western schooling was vital to developing Madagascar's political and economic strength, in 1825 Radama declared primary schooling to be compulsory for the andriana (nobles) throughout Imerina. Schools were constructed in larger towns throughout the central highlands and staffed with teachers from the LMS and other missionary organizations. By the end of Radama's reign in 1829, 38 schools were providing basic education to over 4,000 students in addition to the 300 students studying at the Palace School, teaching dual messages of loyalty and obedience to Radama's rule and the fundamentals of Christian theology. These schools also provided Radama with a ready pool of educated conscripts for his military activities; consequently, some andriana families sent slave children to spare their own offspring from the perils of military life, exposing an educated minority among the lower classes of Merina society to the tenets of Christianity. An additional 600 students received vocational training under Scottish missionary James Cameron. Despite high attendance at the schools, the LMS were initially unsuccessful in converting pupils to Christianity. Near the end of Radama's reign, the king perceived the few Malagasy who had been converted as irreverent toward royal authority. He forbade Malagasy people from being baptized or attending Christian services.

=== Repression ===
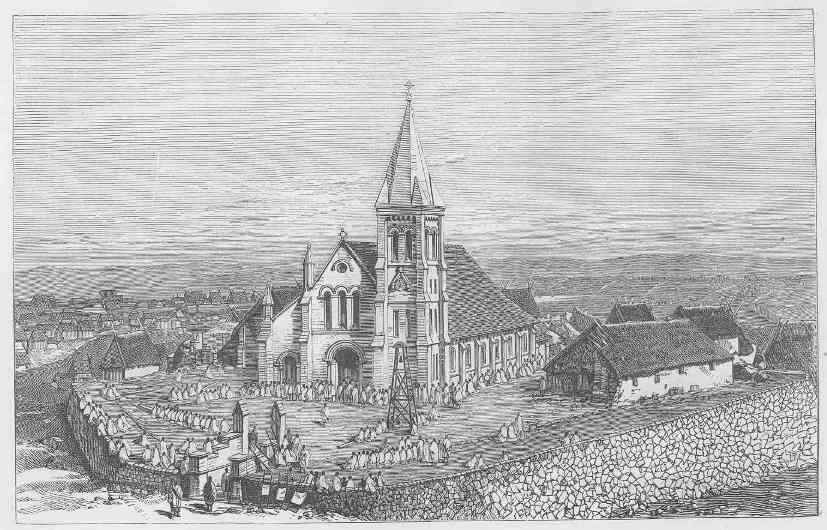
Ambatonakanga Church, Madagascar (London LMS], 1869, p. 48)

Radama died in 1828 and was succeeded by his widow, Ranavalona I. Her succession initially resulted in a relaxation of state control over Christianity. The island's first printing press, which was imported by LMS missionaries at the end of Radama's reign, was only effectively put into operation in 1828. The press was in heaviest use during the first several years of Ranavalona's reign, when thousands of hymnals and other materials were transcribed and printed. Translation of the New Testament was completed in the second year of her reign, and 3,000 copies were printed and distributed between 1829 and 1830. From the beginning of her reign, Ranavalona forbade the distribution of books within the military to prevent subversion and preserve discipline. She allowed missionaries free rein in operating the printing press, however, and exempted from military service all Malagasy personnel trained to operate the press. In 1835, translation of the Old Testament was completed and the first copies were printed. The freedom allowed to LMS and Malagasy Christians to print religious materials and teach religion in the state schools during the first six years of Ranavalona's reign allowed Christianity to become firmly established among a small but growing group of converts in and around the capital. In 1831, Ranavalona authorized Malagasy attendance at church services, administration of the sacrament, and baptism of her subjects. Within a year, the first 100 Malagasy were baptized out of an estimated 200 practicing Christians total; these converts were drawn from all social classes, including slaves, commoners, respected elders, court officials and even sampy guardians, who were considered the bulwarks of traditional culture.

The conversion of major religious, political and social leaders sparked a backlash that led Ranavalona to become increasingly wary of the political and cultural effects of Christianity, which she saw as leading the Malagasy to forsake the ancestors and their traditions. In October and November 1831, the queen enacted a ban on Christian marriages, church services, and baptisms for soldiers and members of government studying in the schools. In December 1831, she extended the ban on church service attendance to all Malagasy. From 1832 to 1834, baptisms and church services continued, increasingly in secret. During this time, several Christians each year were charged with witchcraft and exiled or made to undergo the tangena ordeal, and Ranavalona requested the departure of three missionaries, retaining only those whose particular technical skills she viewed as valuable to the state. In 1835, the queen attempted to shut down the press without directly targeting the LMS by banning Malagasy personnel from working at the printing house. The LMS missionaries, capitalizing on the absence of legal decrees against their own work at the press, managed to continue independently printing and distributing materials.

Christianity involved a repudiation of the ancestral customs of the country, established by previous monarchs who were her ancestors. The queen's legitimacy depended entirely on her relation to her predecessors, who had given the kingdom to her. Furthermore ... she was queen because she was the descendant of the royal ancestors, who were in a mystical sense the ancestors of all the Merina. To deny her mystical power was to repudiate not only her but also the ancestors, the quintessence of good and blessings ... She was the custodian of a holy trust ... Christianity was therefore treason ... in Ranavalona's words it was "the substitution of the respect of her ancestors, Andrianampoinimerina and Radama, for the respect of the ancestor of the whites: Jesus Christ." She saw the introduction of a new religion as a political act, and there is no doubt that she was right.

— Maurice Bloch, From Blessing to Violence (1986)

In a kabary speech on 26 February 1835, Queen Ranavalona formally forbade the practice of Christianity among her subjects. In her discourse, she was careful to differentiate between her own people, for whom the new religion was forbidden and its practice a capital offense, and foreigners, to whom she permitted freedom of religion and conscience. She furthermore acknowledged the valuable intellectual and technological contributions that European missionaries had made to the advancement of her country and invited them to continue working to that end on the condition that their proselytizing would cease:

"To the English or French strangers: I thank you for the good that you have done in my land and my kingdom, where you have made known European wisdom and knowledge. Do not worry yourselves—I will not change the customs and rites of our ancestors. Nevertheless, whoever breaks the laws of my kingdom will be put to death—whoever he may be. I welcome all wisdom and all knowledge which are good for this country. It would be a waste of time and effort to grab the customs and rites of my ancestors. Concerning religious practice—baptism or assemblies—it is forbidden for my people who inhabit this land to take part whether on Sunday or during the week. Concerning you, foreigners, you can practice according to your own manners and customs. Nevertheless, if skilled handiwork and other practical skills exist, which can profit our people, exercise these skills that good will come. These are my instructions which I make known to you."

— Ranavalomanjaka, Kabary, February 26, 1835

The majority of the London Missionary Society missionaries, whose primary activity was teaching Christian theology and literacy at their newly established schools using the Bible as the principal Malagasy-language text, departed the island. James Cameron and other key missionaries preferred to leave rather than remain on the island without authorization to proselytize. The last two remaining missionaries chose to continue teaching practical skills in the hope that the restrictions might loosen, but one year later, after receiving indirect information that the government desired their departure, they shuttered the LMS mission and left Madagascar.

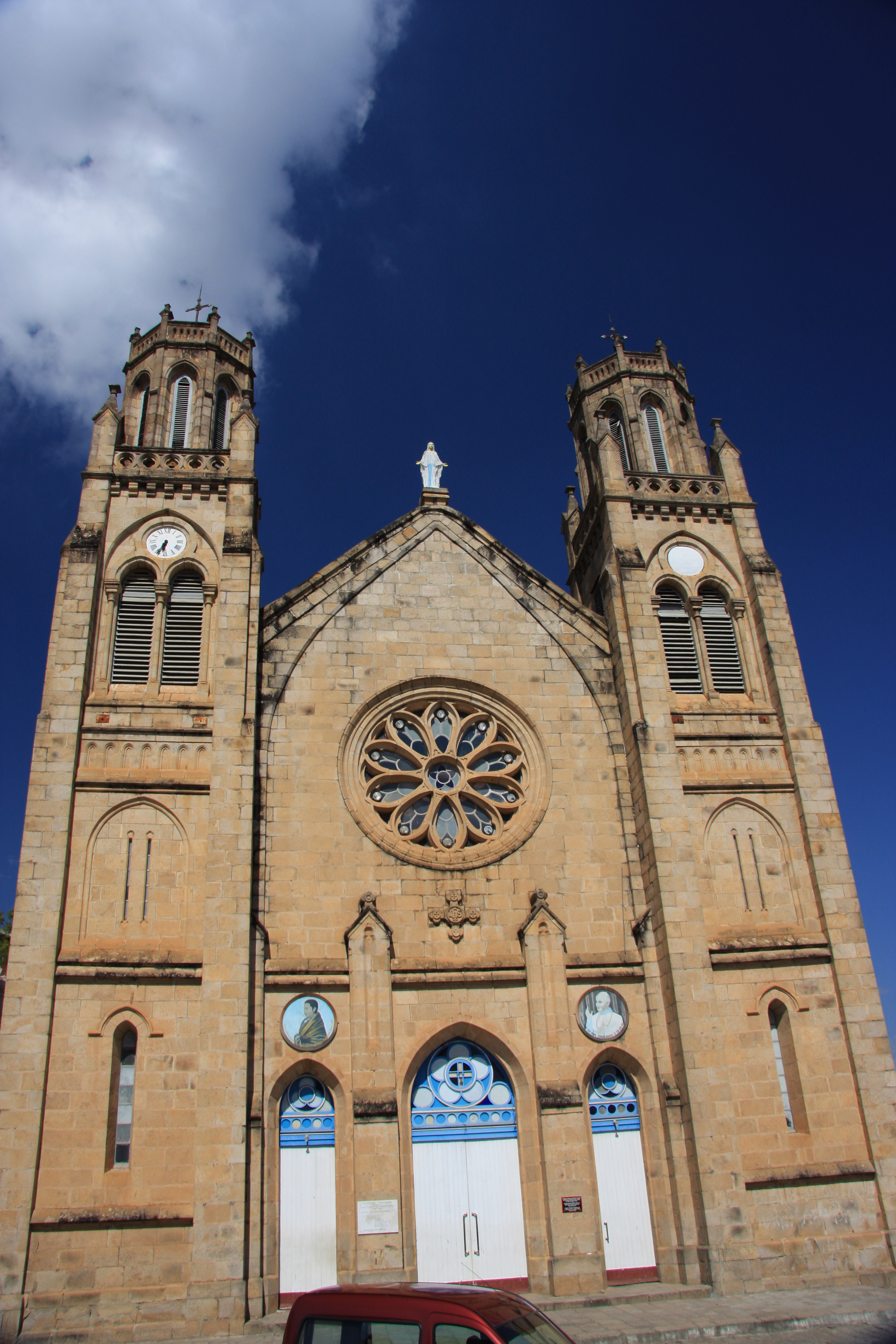
Andohalo cathedral, built on a cliff in Antananarivo where Queen Ranavalona I had early Malagasy Christian martyrs executed

Pursuant to the 26 February decree, those who possessed a Bible, worshiped in congregation, or continued to profess adherence to Christianity were fined, jailed, manacled, subjected to tangena or another trial by ordeal, or executed. Lurid accounts of the execution and torture of Christians were reported by missionaries with informants on the island who placed emphasis on what they perceived as the savagery of the queen's actions. For instance, they reported the public execution of fifteen Christian leaders near the queen's palace who were dangled on ropes 150 feet above a rock-filled ravine before the ropes were cut upon their refusal to renounce Christianity. The Andohalo cathedral was constructed on this outcropping to commemorate early Malagasy Christians martyred at the site. The number of Malagasy citizens put to death for religious reasons during Ranavalona's reign is unknown. British missionary to Madagascar W.E. Cummins places the number executed at between 60 and 80. Far more were required to undergo the tangena ordeal, condemned to hard labor, or stripped of their land and property, and many of these died. Persecution of Christians intensified; in 1849, 1,900 people were fined, jailed, or otherwise punished for their Christian faith, of whom 18 were executed.

=== Legitimization and mass conversion ===
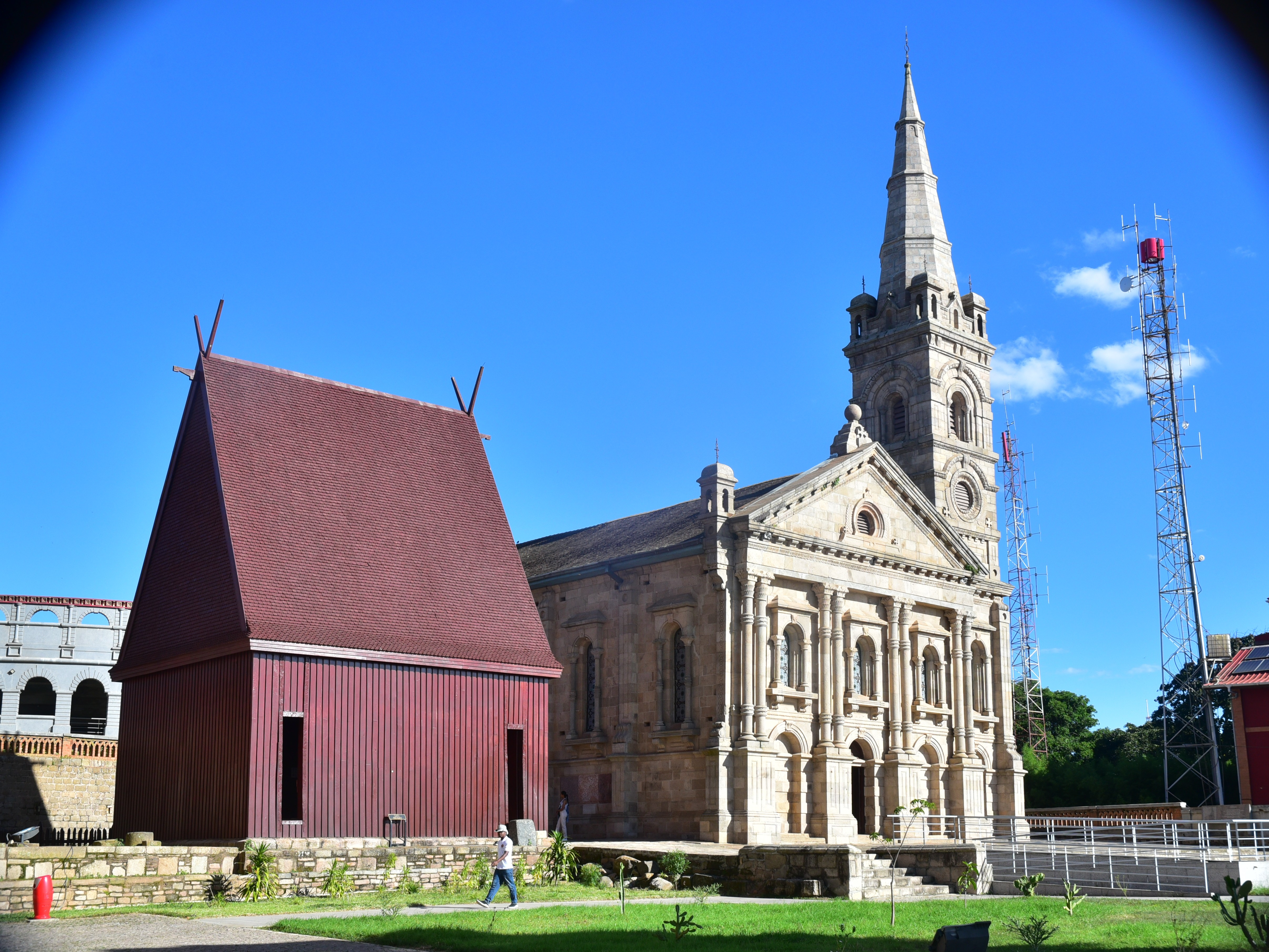
Lapan’ny Besakana and the Royal Church of Anatirova, located within the Rova of Madagascar in Antananarivo

Upon Ranavalona's death in 1861, she was succeeded by her reformist son, Radama II, who rapidly repealed many of his mother's policies. Freedom of religion was declared, persecution of Christians ceased, missionaries returned to the island, and their schools were authorized to be reopened. However, Radama's disregard for the counsel of his advisers' warning against too abrupt a process of modernization produced a coup d'état, in which Radama was presumably killed and power effectively transferred to Prime Minister Rainivoninahitriniony. He was succeeded by Rainilaiarivony, who wed Radama's widow Rasoherina and governed from 1864 until his exile in 1895 following French capture of the capital in September 1894. Rainilaiarivony's second royal wife, Ranavalona II (crowned on 3 September 1868 following Rasoherina's death), was a pupil of Protestant missionaries and had converted to Christianity. Rainilaiarivony recognized the growing power of Christianity on the island and identified the need to bring it under his influence in order to avert destabilizing cultural and political power struggles. The prime minister encouraged the new queen to Christianize the court through a public baptism ceremony at Andohalo on 21 February 1869, the day of their marriage. In this ceremony the supernatural royal talismans were ordered to be destroyed and replaced by the Bible. The Christianization of the court and the establishment of the independent royal Protestant chapel on the palace grounds prompted the wide-scale conversion of hundreds of thousands of Malagasy.

These conversions were commonly motivated by a desire to express political allegiance to the Crown, and as such were largely nominal, with the majority of converts practicing a syncretic blend of Christian and traditional religions. Rainilaiarivony's biographers conclude that his conversion was also largely a political gesture and most likely did not denote a genuine spiritual shift until late in his life, if ever. Some local officials attempted to force conversions to Protestantism by mandating church attendance and persecuting Catholics, but Rainilaiarivony quickly responded to quell these overzealous practices. The prime minister's criminalization of polygamy and alcohol consumption, as well as the declaration of Sunday as a day of rest, were likewise inspired by the growing Protestant influence in the country.

== Syncretic practice ==
Approximately 4.5% of the population practiced traditional beliefs according to the Pew Research Center in 2010. A survey in 2020 put this figure at 39.22%. This traditional religion attributes all of creation to a single god, called Zanahary or Andriamanitra. In addition, it tends to emphasize links between the living and the razana (ancestors). The veneration of ancestors has led to the widespread tradition of tomb building, as well as the highlands practice of the famadihana, whereby a deceased family member's remains may be exhumed to be periodically re-wrapped in fresh silk shrouds before being replaced in the tomb. In the 2010, many Christians integrated their religious beliefs with traditional ones related to honoring the ancestors; for instance, the Malagasy may bless their dead at church before proceeding with traditional burial rites or invite a Christian minister to consecrate a famadihana reburial.

== Denominations and organizations ==
In 2022, the World Religion Database stated that 58% of the country was Christian; 30.88% of the population were Protestant, 25.28% were Catholic and there were a few followers of other Christian groups. Other surveys suggested that approximately 34% were Catholic and 36.5% were Protestant.

The Malagasy Council of Churches comprises the four oldest and most prominent Christian denominations (Catholic, Church of Jesus Christ in Madagascar, Lutheran, and Anglican) and has been an influential force in Malagasy politics. In the disputed 2001 presidential elections, the council rallied behind Protestant candidate Ravalomanana, whose electoral slogan was "Don't be afraid, only believe."

The Church of Jesus Christ in Madagascar, a Reformed Protestant church, had 2.5 million adherents in 2004; former President Marc Ravalomanana served as its vice-president.

There were 21 Catholic dioceses in Madagascar in 2013, including five archdioceses.

== See also ==
- Religion in Madagascar
- Catholic Church in Madagascar
- Malagasy Lutheran Church
