= List of Imerina monarchs =

Monarchy of Imerina
- Coat of Arms (1896–97)

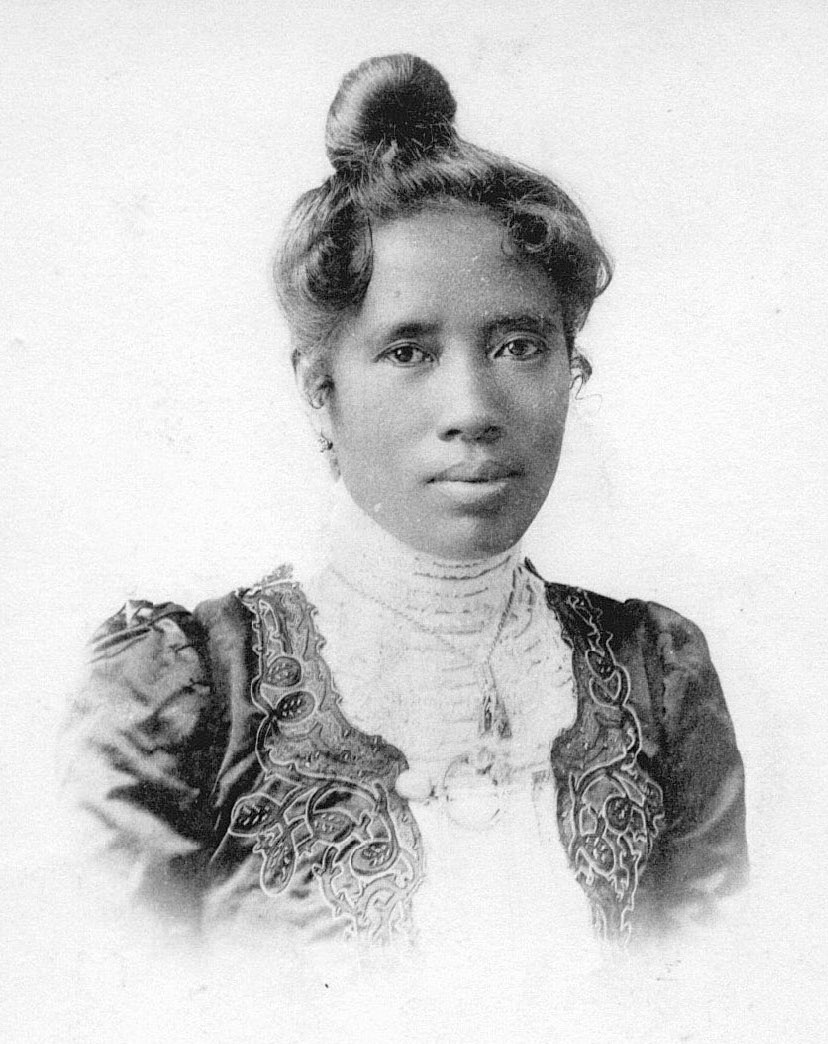
- Last to reign Ranavalona III; 30 July 1883 – 28 February 1897

Details
- First monarch: Radama I
- Last monarch: Ranavalona III
- Formed: 6 July 1810
- Abolished: 28 February 1897
- Residences: Ambohimanga (spiritual); Rova of Antananarivo (political)

Family tree of the Imerina monarchs and consorts.

This article lists the Imerina monarchs, from the earliest origins of the Merina monarchy until the French conquest of the Kingdom of Imerina during the Second Madagascar expedition.

== Early monarchs in the Merina line ==
Below is a list of the line of Merina monarchs that ruled in the Central Highlands of Madagascar and from whom were issued the first true monarchs of a united Madagascar in the 19th century. Before the uniting of Madagascar, succession was based on the current monarch's designation of an heir, typically from among their own children. As such, the list below represents a direct genealogical line from the last 19th-century queen of Madagascar to some of the earliest known rulers identified in the 15th century or before. Prior to the 16th century, detailed information about the names and dates of Merina rulers becomes less consistent. Genealogy in this early period are derived primarily from oral history, while later names and dates are verifiable from primary sources. These combined sources provide the following list of Merina rulers preceding Andrianampoinimerina's unification of Imerina in the Central Highlands and his son Radama I's successful conquest of the majority of Madagascar, bringing the island under his rule.

Asterisks denote names drawn from oral history without substantive evidence to verify the ruler's life or reign, viz., legendary or semi-legendary monarchs.

- Andrianerinerina* (c. 1300–1320) (Son of God incarnate. According to popular belief, descended from the skies and established his kingdom at Anerinerina)
- Andriananjavonana*
- Andrianamponga I*
- Andrianamboniravina*
- Andriandranolava (Andranolava)*
- Andrianampandrandrandava (Rafandrandrava)*
- Andriamasindohafandrana (Ramasindohafandrana)*
- Rafandrampohy*
- Andriampandramanenitra (Rafandramanenitra)*
- Queen Rangita (Rangitamanjakatrimovavy) (1520–1530)
- Queen Rafohy (1530–1540)
- King Andriamanelo (1540–1575)
- King Ralambo (1575–1612)
- King Andrianjaka (1612–1630)
- King Andriantsitakatrandriana (1630–1650)
- King Andriantsimitoviaminandriandehibe (1650–1670)
- King Andrianjaka Razakatsitakatrandriana (1670–1675)
- King Andriamasinavalona (Andrianjakanavalondambo) (1675–1710)
- King Andriantsimitoviaminiandriana Andriandrazaka (Andriantsimitoviaminandriandrazaka) (1710–1730)
- King Andriambelomasina (1730–1770)
- King Andrianjafynandriamanitra (Andrianjafinjanahary or Andrianjafy) (1770–1787)
- King Andrianampoinimerina (1787–1810)

== Monarchs of the Kingdom of Imerina (1810–1897) ==
Name	Lifespan	Reign start	Reign end	Notes	Family	Image
Radama I: the Great	1793 – 27 July 1828 (aged 35)	6 July 1810	27 July 1828	Son of Andrianampoinimerina	Merina	Radama I of Madagascar
Ranavalona I	1778 – 16 August 1861 (aged 83)	1 August 1828	16 August 1861	Wife of Radama I	Merina	Ranavalona I of Madagascar
Radama II	23 September 1829 – 12 May 1863 (aged 33)	16 August 1861	12 May 1863 (murdered)	Son of Ranavalona I	Merina	Radama II of Madagascar
Rasoherina	1814 – 1 April 1868 (aged 54)	12 May 1863	1 April 1868	Wife of Radama II	Merina	Rasoherina of Madagascar
Ranavalona II	1829 – 13 July 1883 (aged 54)	1 April 1868	13 July 1883	Wife of Radama II	Merina	Ranavalona II of Madagascar
Ranavalona III	22 November 1861 – 23 May 1917 (aged 55)	30 July 1883	28 February 1897 (deposed)	Niece of Ranavalona II; Granddaughter of Radama I	Merina	Ranavalona III of Madagascar

== Monarchs family tree ==
Andrianampoinimerina; 1745–c. 1787–1810
Radama I King of Madagascar; 1793–1810–1828	Ranavalona I Queen of Madagascar; 1778–1828–1861	Andriamihaja	Rainiharo d. 1852	Rainijohary
Radama II; King of Madagascar; 1829–1861–1863	Ranavalona II; Queen of Madagascar; 1829–1868–1883	Rainilaiarivony; Prime Minister of Madagascar; 1828–1864– 1895–1896	Ranavalona III; Queen of Madagascar; 1861–1883– 1897–1917	Raharo; Prime Minister of Madagascar; 1824–1852– 1865–1868
Rasoherina; Queen of Madagascar; 1814–1863–1868

== After the fall ==
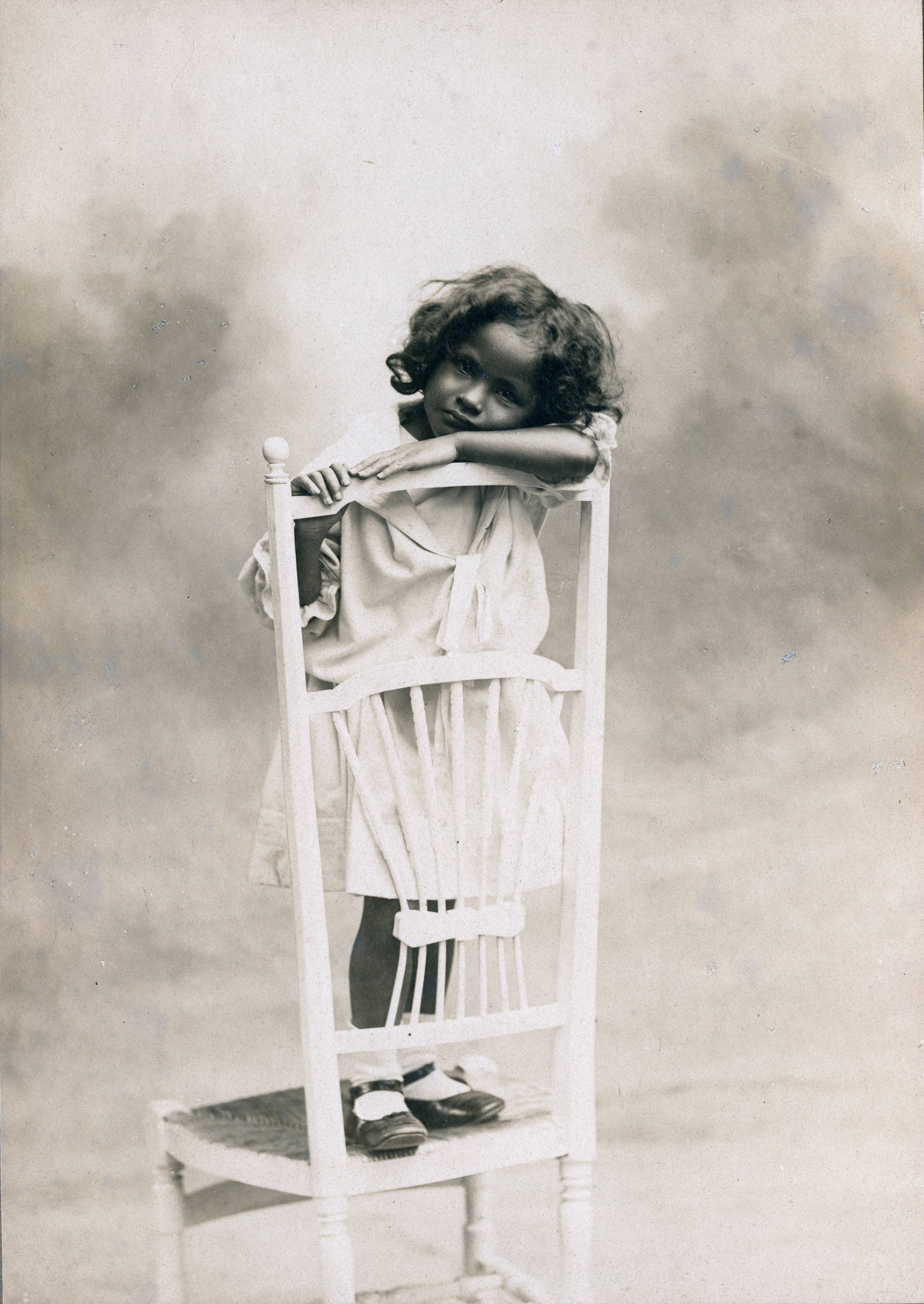
Niece and heir apparent of the Queen Ranavalona III, Marie-Louise, in 1900

After the fall of the Royal House, and the death of the last ruling Sovereign, Queen Ranavalona III's heir apparent, Princess Marie-Louise of Madagascar, remained. She died childless in 1948.

== See also ==
- List of colonial governors of Madagascar
- List of presidents of Madagascar
- Prime Minister of Madagascar
