= Radama =

Radama may refer to:

- Radama I (c. 1793-1828), the first king of Madagascar
- Radama II (1829–1863), king of the Merina Kingdom of Madagascar
