= Ranavalona =

Ranavalona is the name of three 19th-century queens of the Merina Kingdom in Madagascar:

- Ranavalona I (ruled 1828–1861) notable for attempting to preserve traditional ways against the growing European influence and for major persecution of Christians.
- Ranavalona II (ruled 1868–1883) notable for adopting Christianity as state religion
- Ranavalona III (ruled 1883–1897) the last monarch of the Merina, deposed during French colonial conquest
