= Second Madagascar expedition =

1894–1895 French conquest of the Merina Kingdom

Madagascar Expedition
- Part of the Franco-Hova Wars
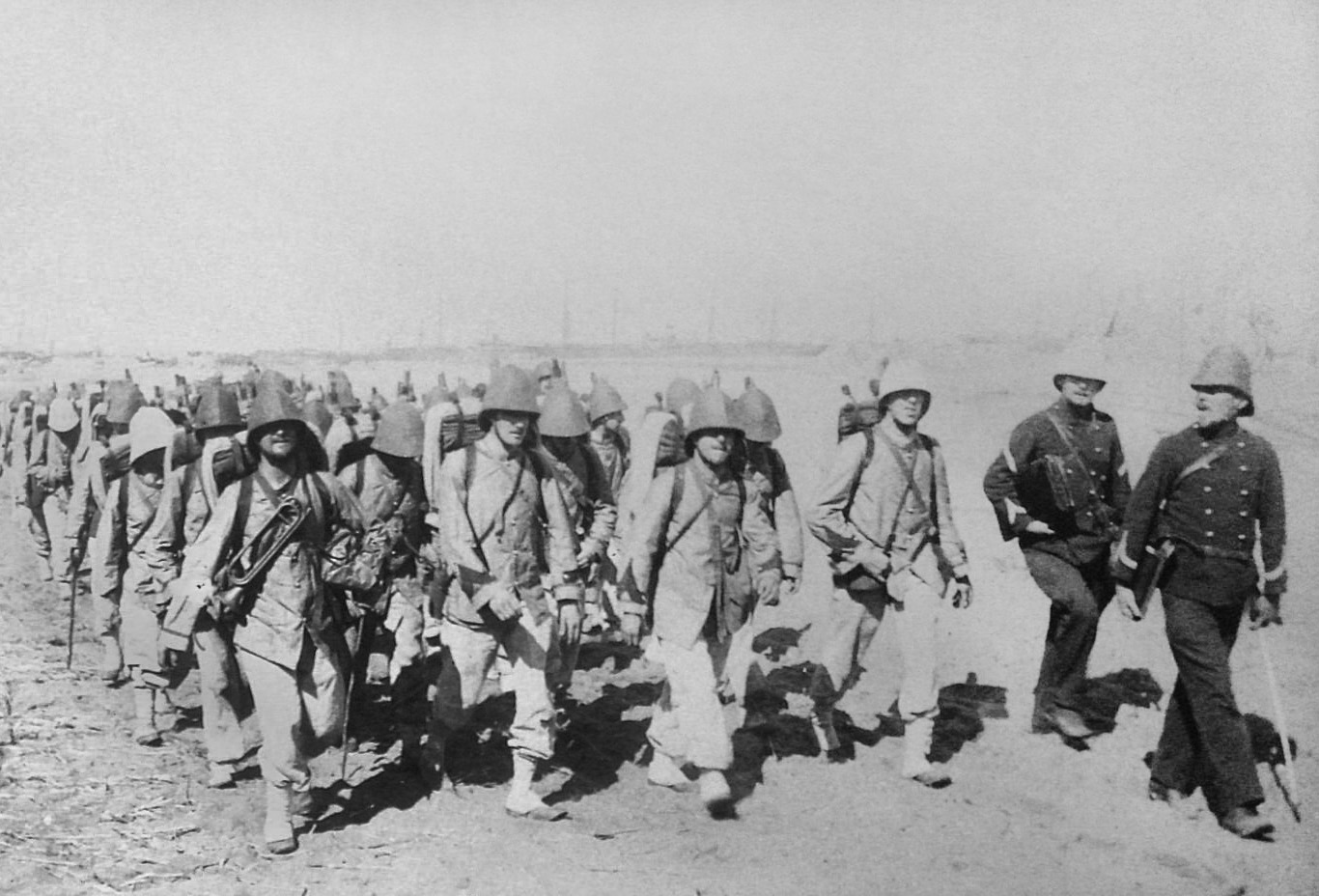
- French infantry landing at Majunga, May 1895.
Date	December 1894 – 1 October 1895
Location	Madagascar
Result	French victory: Establishment of the Malagasy Protectorate

Belligerents
France	Merina Kingdom

Commanders and leaders
(French Third Republic) Jacques Duchesne	(Imerina) Rainilaiarivony

Strength
15,000 soldiers 6,000 porters	30,000; 40,000 reservists

Casualties and losses
25 killed in combat 6,000 died of disease	4,500 killed in combat

The Second Madagascar expedition was a French military intervention which took place in 1894–1895, sealing the conquest of the Merina Kingdom on the island of Madagascar by France. It was the last phase of the Franco-Hova War and followed the First Madagascar expedition of 1883–1885.

== Background ==
Madagascar was at the time an independent country, ruled from the capital of Antananarivo by the Merina dynasty from the central highlands. The French invasion was triggered by the refusal of Queen Ranavalona III to accept a protectorate treaty from France, despite the signature of the Franco-Hova Treaty of 1885 following the First Madagascar expedition. Resident-general Charles Le Myre de Vilers broke negotiation and effectively declared war on the Malagasy monarchy.

== The expedition ==
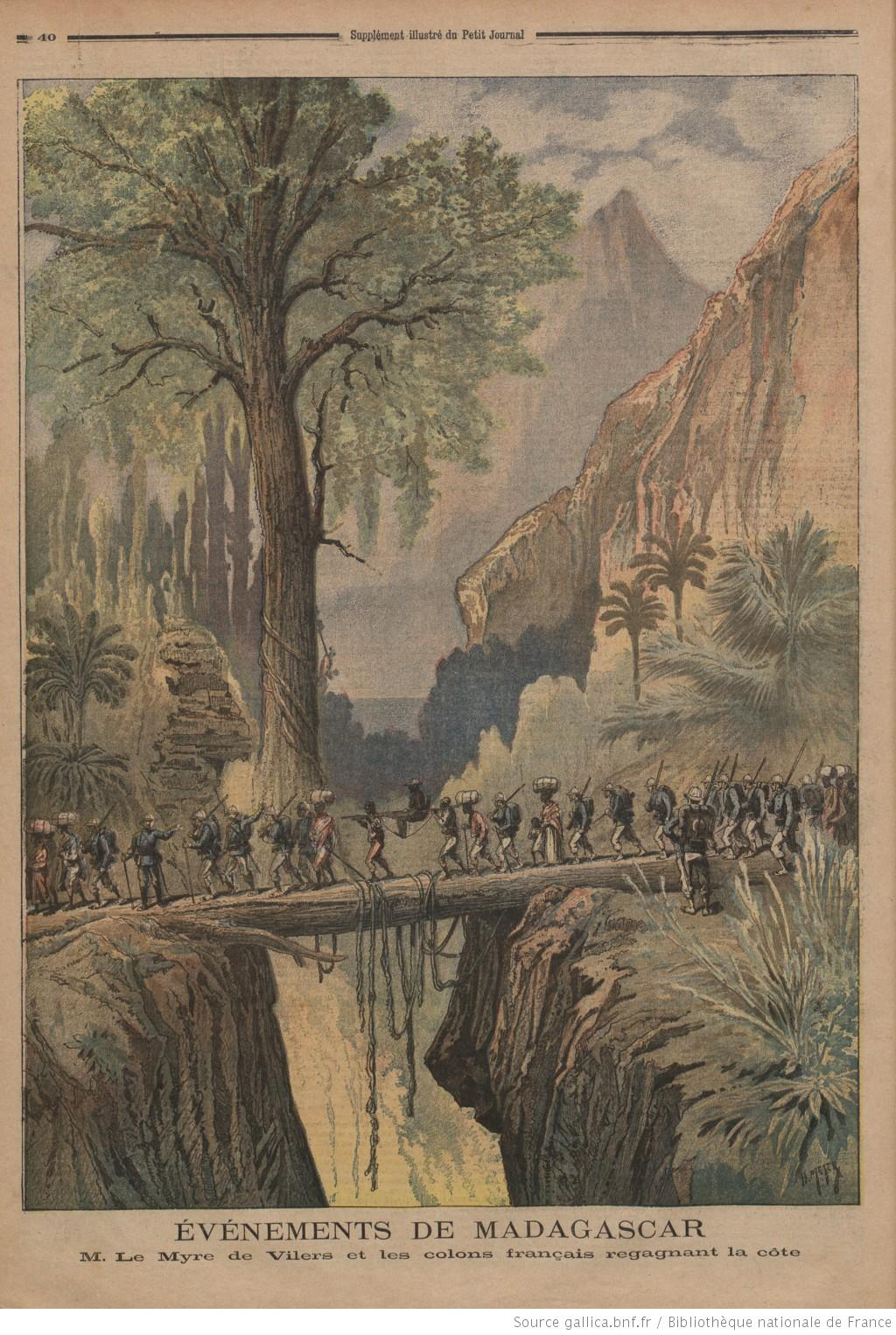
Second Madagascar expedition depicted in Le Petit Journal, with the legend: "Events of Madagascar. M. Le Myre de Vilers and the colons leaving the coast."

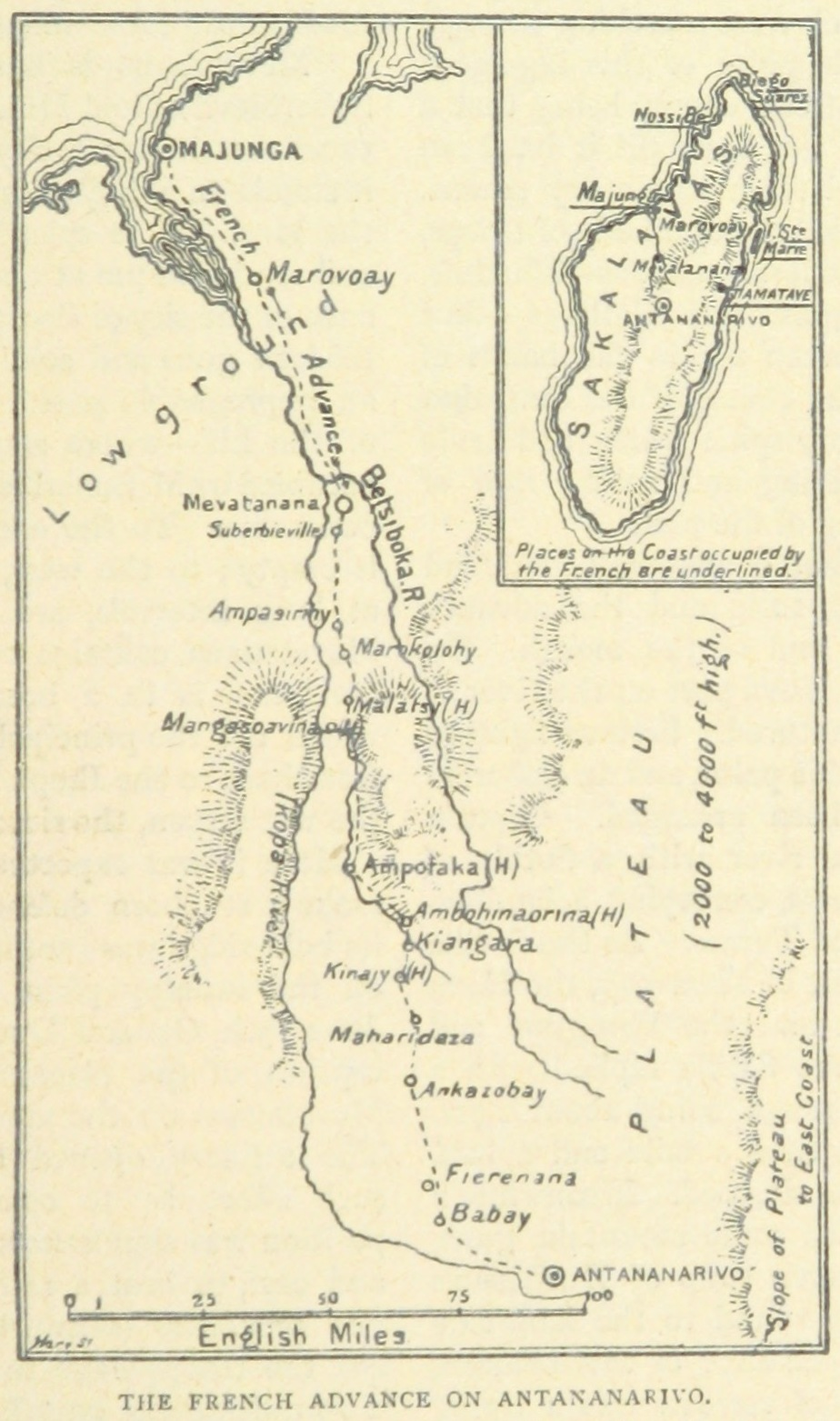
The French route to Antananarivo

An expeditionary corps was sent under General Jacques Duchesne. First, the harbor of Toamasina on the east coast, and Mahajanga on the west coast, were bombarded and occupied in December 1894 and January 1895 respectively. Some troops were landed, but the main expeditionary force, however, arrived in May 1895, numbering about 15,000 men, supported by around 6,000 carriers. The campaign was to take place during the rainy season, with disastrous consequences for the French expeditionary corps.

As soon as the French landed, revolts erupted here and there against the Merina government of Queen Ranavalona III. The uprisings were variously against the government, slave labour, Christianisation (the court had converted to Protestantism in the 1860s).

As the French force advanced towards Antananarivo, they had to build a road along the way. By August 1895, the French were only mid-way at Andriba where there were numerous Malagasy fortifications but only limited fighting. Disease, especially malaria, but also dysentery and typhoid fever, was taking a heavy toll on the French expeditionary corps. The expedition was a medical disaster: about 1/3 of the force died of disease. Altogether, there were 6,000 deaths in the expedition, four-fifths of them French.

The Malagasy Prime Minister and Commander-in-Chief Rainilaiarivony tried to resist at Tsarasaotra on the 29 June 1895, and at Andriba on the 22 August 1895. He again attacked the Duchesne "flying column" in September, but his elite gunner troops were decimated by the French.

Duchesne had to send a "flying column" from Andriba on the 14 September 1895, formed of Algerian and African soldiers as well as marines and accompanied by pack mules, to the capital. They arrived at the end of September. An artillery battery was trained on the royal palace from the heights around the capital, and high-explosive shells were fired on the palace, killing many. The Queen promptly surrendered.

In the whole conflict, there were only a few skirmishes, and only 25 French soldiers died from fighting.

On 1 October 1895, the Merina Kingdom signed a treaty with France wherein it became a French protectorate.

== Aftermath ==
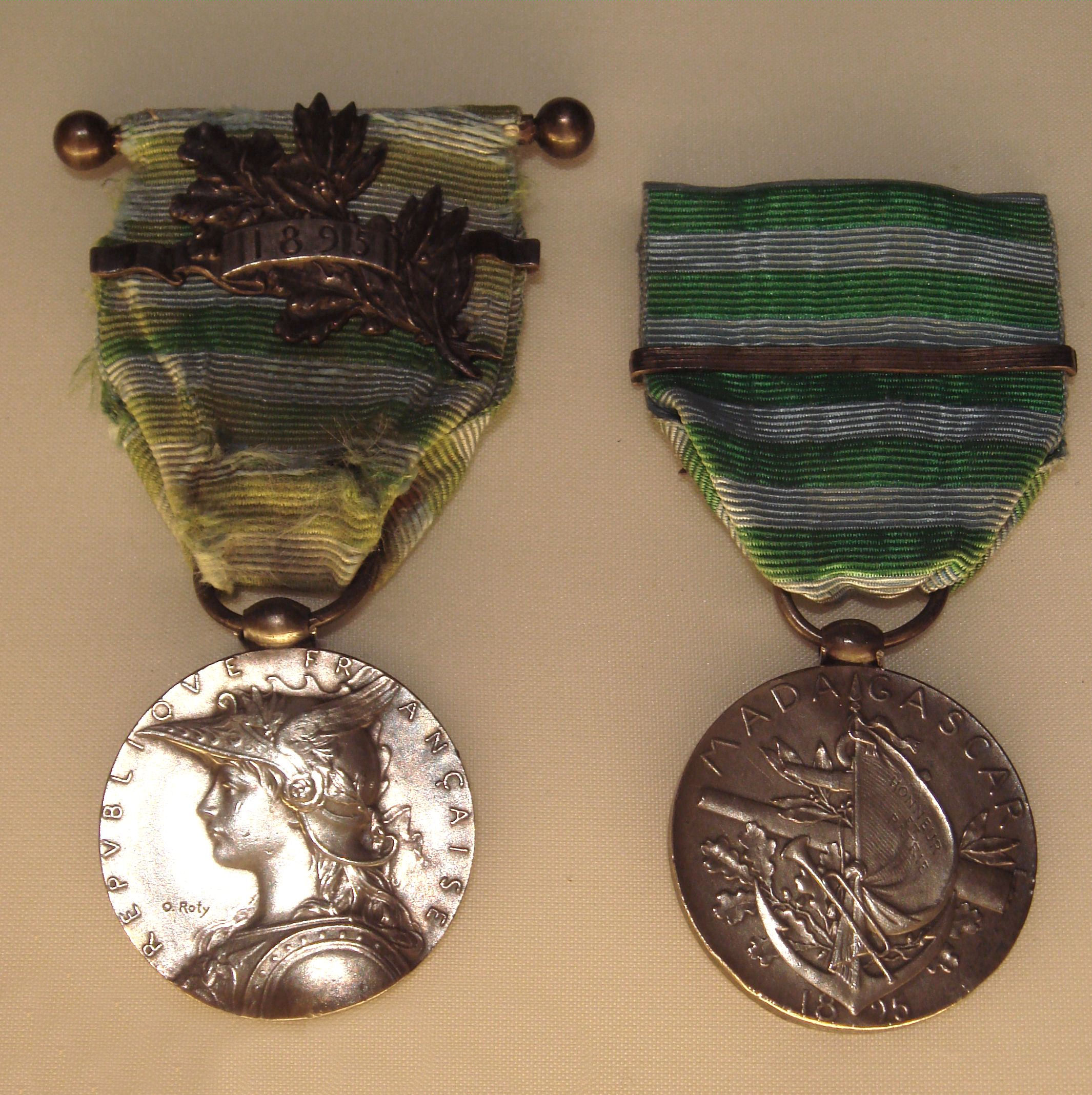
Medal of the Second Madagascar Expedition. Law of 15 January 1896. Musée de la Légion d'Honneur.

The conquest of the island was formalized by the 20 June 1896 vote at the French National Assembly, which was promulgated on 6 August 1896 and resulted in favor of the annexation of Madagascar.

Despite the success of the expedition, the quelling of the sporadic rebellions would take another eight years until 1905, when the island was completely pacified by the French under Joseph Gallieni. During that time, insurrections against the Malagasy Christians of the island, missionaries and foreigners were particularly terrible. Queen Ranavalona III was deposed in January 1897 and was exiled to Algiers in Algeria, where she died in 1917.

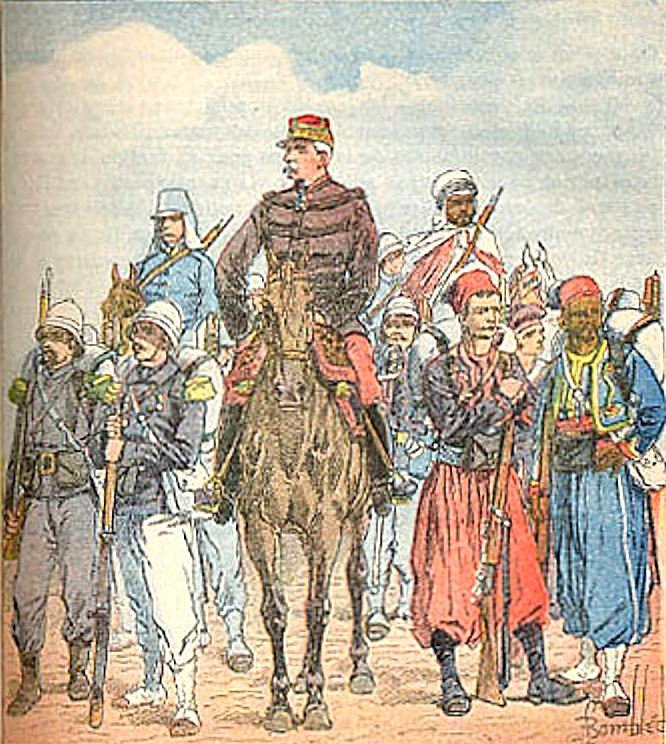
Madagascar French expeditionary troops.

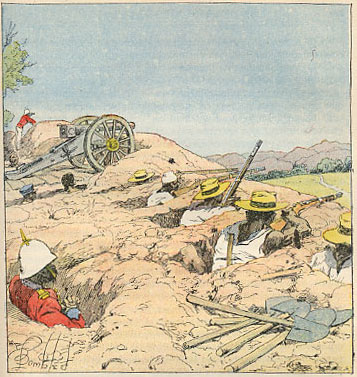
Merina troops in ambush.

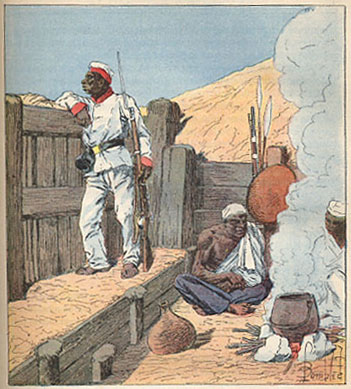
Merina troops standing guard.

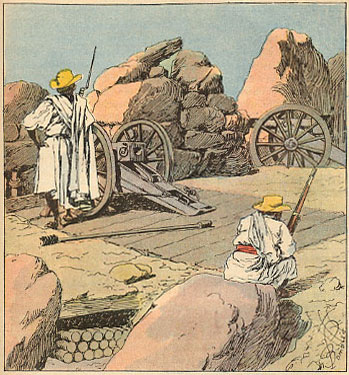
Merina artillery.

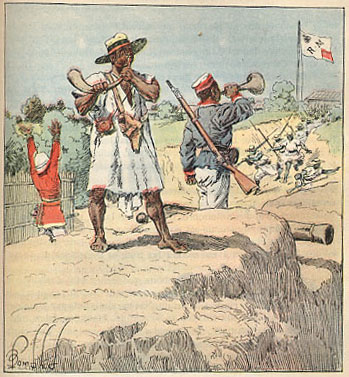
Merina troops raising the alarm.

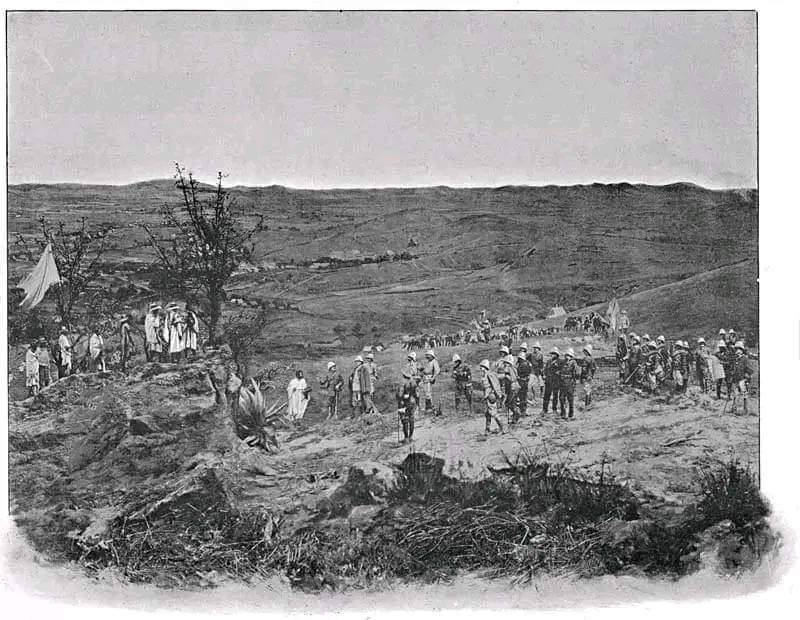
Merina troops surrender to the french colonial army.
