= Andriandramaka =

Andriandramaka (Dian Ramach) was a king of the Antanosy tribe of the southeastern of Madagascar. He was the son of the king Tsiambany. His father concluded a treaty with Paulo Rodrigues Da Costa in which he had to entrust his son Andrianjerivao to be educated and baptized in Goa in 1613. At the time of departure, the king suddenly changed his mind and no longer agreed to separate from his son. Instead of his brother, the furious Portuguese carried off Andriandramaka by force making him the first malagasy to receive a western education. The Portuguese named him "Don André". He came back to the country in 1616. He attacked several times the French of Fort-Dauphin but he was killed by them in 1651 with his son Andriantsanjoa.
