= Ambohimandroso, Ambalavao =

Ambohimandroso
- Location in Madagascar
- Coordinates: 21°53′S 46°57′E
- Country: Madagascar
- Region: Haute Matsiatra
- District: Ambalavao
- Elevation: 953 m (3,127 ft)

Population (2001)
  - Total: 12,000
- Time zone: UTC3 (EAT)

Ambohimandroso is a town and commune in Madagascar. It belongs to the district of Ambalavao, which is a part of Haute Matsiatra Region. The population of the commune was estimated to be approximately 12,000 in 2001 commune census.

Primary and junior level secondary education are available in town. The majority 95% of the population of the commune are farmers. The most important crop is tobacco, while other important products are cassava, rice and tomato. Services provide employment for 5% of the population.
