= Joseph-François Lambert =

French adventurer, businessman and diplomat (1824-1873)

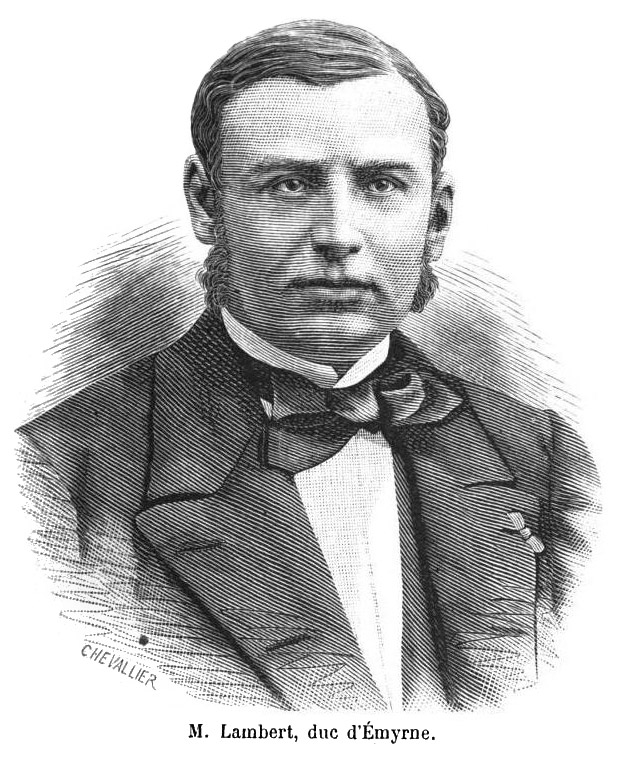
Engraving of Joseph-François Lambert

Joseph-François Lambert, the "Duke of Imerina" (1824–1873) was a French adventurer, businessman, and diplomat who fathered the Lambert Charter.

== Early years ==
Lambert was born in Redon, Ille-et-Vilaine in 1824. He was the brother of Henri Lambert. He traveled to Mauritius where, at the age of 22, he married a wealthy widow and accumulated further wealth by entering the slave trade. In 1854 he relieved a garrison in Madagascar held by Merina troops that had come under threat by a coastal community rebelling against the rule of Queen Ranavalona I. As a reward, he was invited to a royal audience with the queen at her royal compound in Antananarivo. There he met Jean Laborde, a Frenchman who had established an armament industry for the Merina army. Lambert also made the acquaintance of the queen's son and future heir, Prince Rakoto.

== Lambert Charter ==
According to Lambert, the prince gave him the exclusive right to exploit all minerals, forests, and unoccupied land in Madagascar in exchange for a 10-percent royalty payable to the Merina monarchy, although the true events are far more complicated. In years to come, the French would use this "Lambert Charter" and a letter of the prince to Napoléon III asking for French protection to justify the Franco-Hova Wars and the annexation of Madagascar as a colony. The Lambert Charter was signed on 28 June 1855. The authenticity of the documents has been questioned and, in any case, the prince had no official French authority at that time and his actions could have been treacherous.

== Attempted coup ==
With these documents, Lambert went to London and Paris to try to elicit help and support to overthrow the ruling queen and have her replaced by her son. Although no official help was forthcoming, he returned to Madagascar in 1857 to implement the plotted coup himself. The world traveler Ida Pfeiffer was a member of his travel party and thus an unwitting participant in the coup attempt, which ultimately failed. Queen Ranavalona executed the locals who were involved and banished the Europeans implicated, including Lambert, Laborde, and Pfeiffer. Lambert with the survivors embarked and returned to Mauritius.

== Compagnie de Madagascar ==
After the Queen's death in 1861, prince Rakoto succeeded her as King Radama II, and Lambert saw his chance to have the agreement put in place. The new king confirmed the charter and bestowed on him the title of "Duke of Merina" (duc d'Imerina). Lambert and other businessmen founded the Compagnie de Madagascar in Paris as a joint stock company to take advantage of the charter; its official title was La compagnie de Madagascar financière, industrielle et commerciale and it was authorized by imperial decree of 2 May 1863.

The special privileges accorded to Joseph-François Lambert and his partners under the Lambert Charter – including the implementation of public works projects (fallen trees, making roads, building canals etc.), control over minting coinage, exclusive mining rights and more as part of the purview of Lambert's proposed Compagnie de Madagascar (French Madagascar Company) – were especially controversial. The citizens' concern stemmed from clauses in the agreement that would have permit Lambert's company to become permanent owners of Malagasy lands. Until this point, land in Madagascar, which was viewed by the populace as the sacred ground of the ancestors, could only ever be temporarily possessed by foreigners until their death, at which point the land would revert to the crown. The threat of permanently losing any part of sacred Malagasy soil to foreigners was deeply troubling and galvanized many in Radama's court against him.

Radama was assassinated on 12 May 1863. The new government under Queen Rasoherina and Prime Minister Rainivoninahitriniony sought to renegotiate the charter, leading to considerable friction between the Companie de Madagascar and the French government versus the Merina. It would still take three decades and several French interventions to make Madagascar a French colony. Breaking of the Lambert Charter was one of the pretenses for later French military involvement in the Franco-Hova war that led to the French conquest of the island.

As the situation in Madagascar had turned unfavourable after the death of Radama II, Lambert moved to the Comoro Islands in 1865 where he ruled as Regent of Mwali from 1868–71. He died in 1873.

== Sources ==
- Timeline (in French) accessed 5/21/2007
