= Ranavalona II =

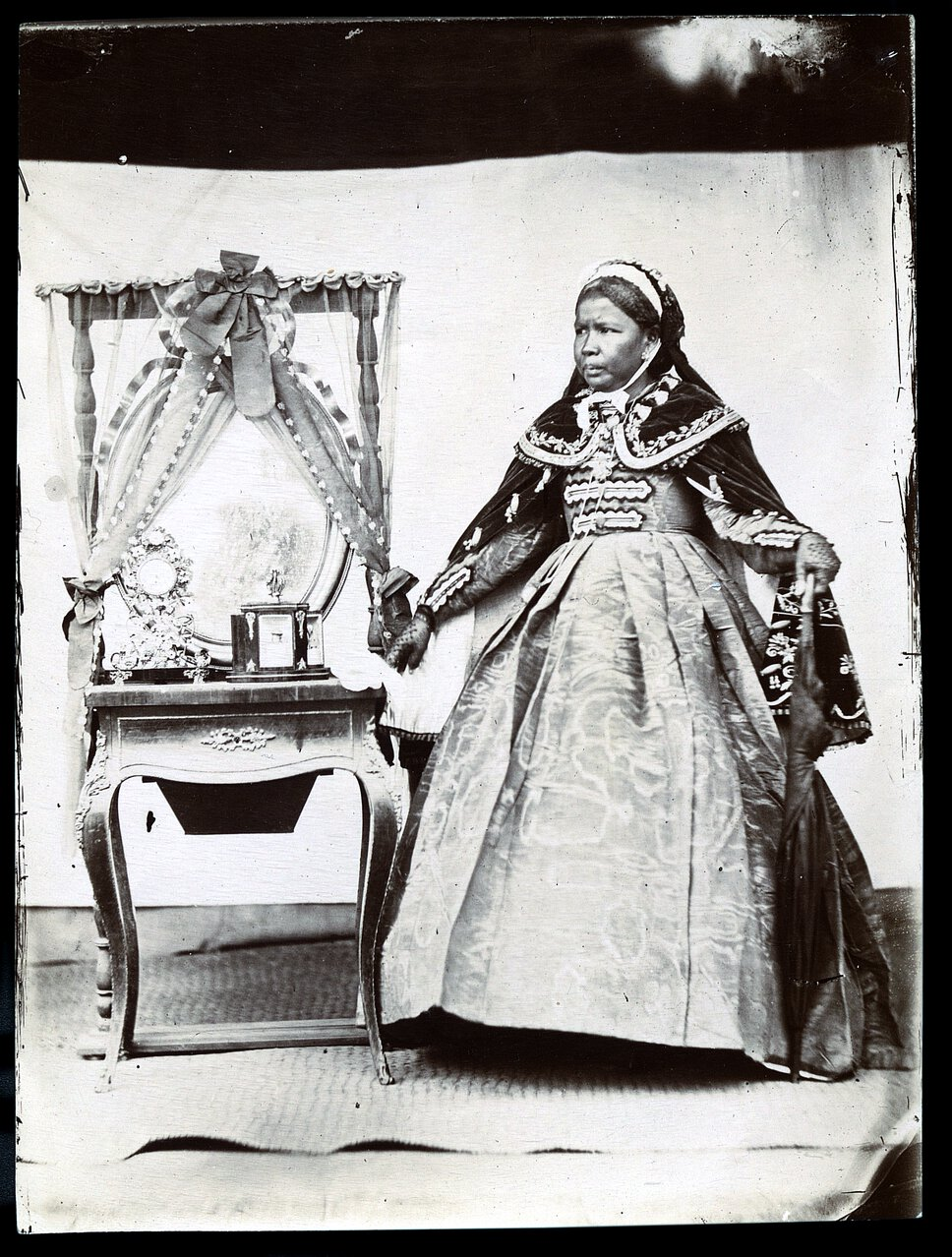
- Ranavalona II, photographed standing

Queen of Madagascar
- Reign: 2 April 1868 – 13 July 1883
- Coronation: 3 September 1868
- Predecessor: Rasoherina
- Successor: Ranavalona III
- Prime Minister: Rainilaiarivony

Queen consort of Madagascar
- Tenure: 1861–1863
- Co-consort: Rasoherina
- Born: 1829; Rovan' Ambatomanoina, Fokontany of Masombahiny
- Died: 13 July 1883 (aged 53–54)
- Burial: 1897; Tomb of the Queens, Rovan' Antananarivo
- Spouse: Radama II; Rainilaiarivony
Names
- Ranavalona II (Ranavalo-Manjaka II); Ramoma
- House: Merina
- Dynasty: Hova dynasty
- Father: Prince Razakaratrimo
- Mother: Princess Rafarasoa Ramasindrazana

Ranavalona II (1829 – 13 July 1883) was Queen of Madagascar from 1868 to 1883, succeeding Queen Rasoherina, her first cousin. She is best remembered for Christianizing the royal court during her reign.

== Early life ==
Ranavalona II was born Princess Ramoma in 1829 at Ambatomanoina, near Antananarivo in the central highlands to Prince Razakaratrimo and his wife Princess Rafarasoa Ramasindrazana. As a young woman she, like her cousin Rasoherina, was married to King Radama II in 1845 or 1846 and was widowed upon his assassination in the nobles' coup of 1863. The prime minister at the time, Rainivoninahitriniony, played a major role in the assassination plot and public condemnation of the action forced him from his post. The position of prime minister was then filled by his younger brother Rainilaiarivony, who married Queen Rasoherina and then, upon her death, helped to designate Ranavalona II the next monarch of Madagascar and consequently married her to retain his position.

During her years at court, young Ramoma was tutored by Protestant missionaries who greatly influenced her religious and political views. She became increasingly favorable toward the beliefs of the Christian religion.

== Reign ==
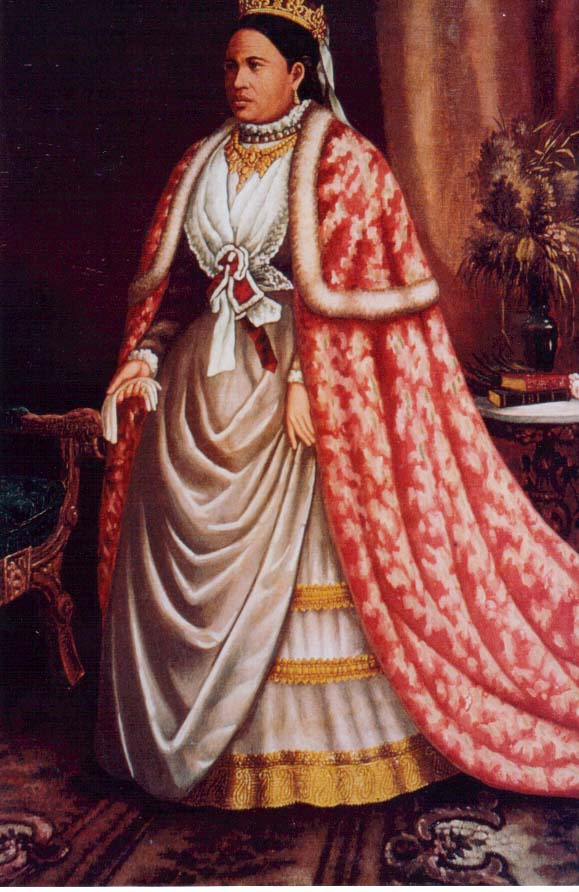
Portrait of Ranavalona II, which once hung at the Rova of Antananarivo.

Ranavalona II succeeded to the throne upon the death of Queen Rasoherina on 1 April 1868. On 21 February 1869, she entered into a political marriage with her prime minister, Rainilaiarivony, in a public ceremony at Andohalo wherein the court officially underwent conversion to Christianity. This conversion was effected to bring the increasingly powerful Protestant faction under the influence of the royal court. Declaring Madagascar a Christian nation, Ranavalona had the traditional royal talismans (sampy) burned in a bonfire in September 1869 and replaced their authority with that of the Bible.

Under her rule the problem of deforestation was considered. The queen authorized construction using brick and other durable materials within the walls of Antananarivo (previously forbidden by King Andrianampoinimerina). She also banned the traditional practice of tavy (swidden, slash-and-burn agriculture), charcoal making and construction of houses within forests.

A European visitor to the court of Ranavalona II in 1873 described the queen in the following terms: "I should think the queen was about 45 years of age, with a dark olive complexion, and a face full of kindness and benevolence. She was very queenly, and dressed in a gray shot-silk dress, and a silk lamba fell negligently from her shoulders. Her hair was black, and beautifully arranged; 'crown she did not wear', but from the hair at the top of her head there depended the long fine gold chain ending in a gold tassel, which only the queen can wear."

== Death and succession ==
Ranavalona II died in 1883 and was buried in Ambohimanga. In a bid to desacralize the holy city, in 1897 the French colonial authority disinterred her remains along with those of other monarchs buried in Ambohimanga and transferred them to the tombs on the compound of the Rova of Antananarivo, where her bones were interred in the tomb of Queen Rasoherina. She was succeeded by Queen Ranavalona III, the last monarch of the kingdom.

Regnal titles
Preceded by Rasoherina	Queen of Madagascar; 2 April 1868 – 13 July 1883	Succeeded by Ranavalona III
