= Rasoherina =

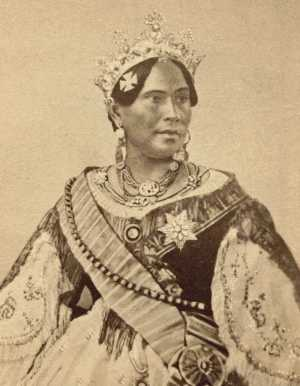
- Queen Rasoherina in about 1865

Queen of Madagascar
- Reign: 12 May 1863 – 1 April 1868
- Coronation: 23 September 1862; 30 August 1863
- Predecessor: Radama II
- Successor: Ranavalona II
- Prime Ministers: Rainivoninahitriniony; Rainilaiarivony

Queen consort of Madagascar
- Tenure: 1861–1863
- Co-consort: Ranavalona II
- Born: 1814; Rovan' Ambatomanoina, Fokontany of Masombahiny
- Died: 1 April 1868 (aged 53–54); Amboditsiry
- Burial: Tomb of the Queens, Rovan Antananarivo
- Spouse: Raharolahy; Radama II; Rainivoninahitriniony; Rainilaiarivony
- Issue: Prince Ratahiry (adoptive); Princess Rasoaveromanana (adoptive)
Names
- Rasoherina-Manjaka; Rabodozanakandriana
- House: Merina
- Dynasty: Hova dynasty
- Father: Prince Andriantsalamanandriana
- Mother: Princess Rafaramanjaka

Rasoherina (1814 – 1 April 1868) (also Rasoherina-Manjaka) was Queen of Madagascar from 1863 to 1868, succeeding her husband Radama II following his presumed assassination.

== Early years ==
Rasoherina, niece of Queen Ranavalona I, was born Princess Rabodozanakandriana in 1814, the daughter of Prince Andriantsalamanandriana, of Ambohitraina and Princess Rafaramanjaka (Ramirahavavy). As a young woman, she married Raharolahy (Raharola), a successful statesman in his own right who received 15 state honors and served as Secretary to the Embassy to the United Kingdom (1836–37), Second Minister for Foreign Affairs in French matters (1862), Minister for the Interior (1862–64), Counselor of Government (1864–65) and Governor of Toamasina (1865). The couple divorced in 1847 and that same year she was married to Ranavalona's son and heir, Rakoto. When he succeeded his mother in 1861 as King Radama II, she was crowned with him as queen consort.

== Accession to the throne ==
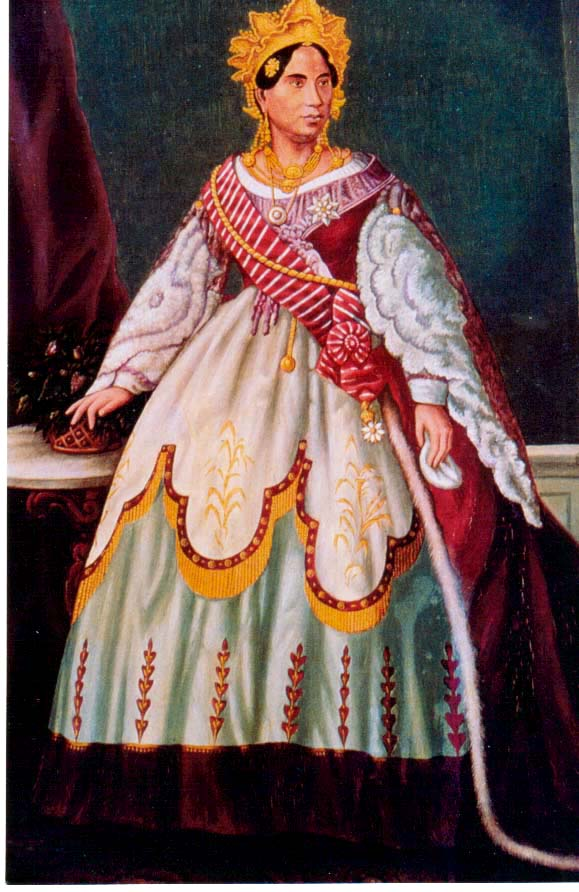
Portrait of Queen Rasoherina

Rasoherina acted as queen consort for only two years before her husband's political decisions succeeded in displeasing his ministers to such an extent that a coup was organized in which Radama II was believed assassinated. A study conducted in the 1960s provides evidence that Radama in fact survived the assassination attempt and lived to old age as a regular citizen outside the capital, although rumors to this end were never proven to be true at the time, and the evolution of life at court pursued its course as if Radama had died. The day of his believed death in 1863, the council of Hova government officials responsible for organizing the coup, headed by the brothers Rainivoninahitriniony and Rainilaiarivony, invited Rabodo to succeed to the throne on the condition that she sign a contract stipulating conditions that in effect created a constitutional monarchy placing the real ruling power in the hands of the prime minister. These conditions included the suppression of tangena (a traditional trial by ordeal) as well as the monarchy's defense of freedom of religion. Rabodo was crowned on 13 May 1863 under the throne name of Rasoherina.

== Reign ==
The real power of the kingdom at the beginning of Rasoherina's reign was Prime Minister Rainivoninahitriniony, instigator of the coup against her husband. The Prime Minister entered into a political marriage with Rasoherina a few weeks after the crowning. Rainivoninahitriniony effectively operated unhindered in his running of state affairs at court where the conservative faction empowered under Ranavalona I was still active under the leadership of her former prime minister, Rainijohary. However, Rainivoninahitriniony's progressives formed a majority in the Queen's Council and their advocacy for a moderately pro-European policy of modernization won out over the reversal of the policies of Radama II that were demanded by Rainijohary's conservatives. However, Rainivoninahitriniony became increasingly despotic and exhibited habitual drunkenness and frequent violence as his power grew, reportedly threatening Queen Rasoherina at knife point on several occasions. One year after taking the throne, Rasoherina deposed Rainivoninahitriniony, appointed his younger brother Rainilaiarivony as prime minister in his stead and contracted a political marriage with him in turn.

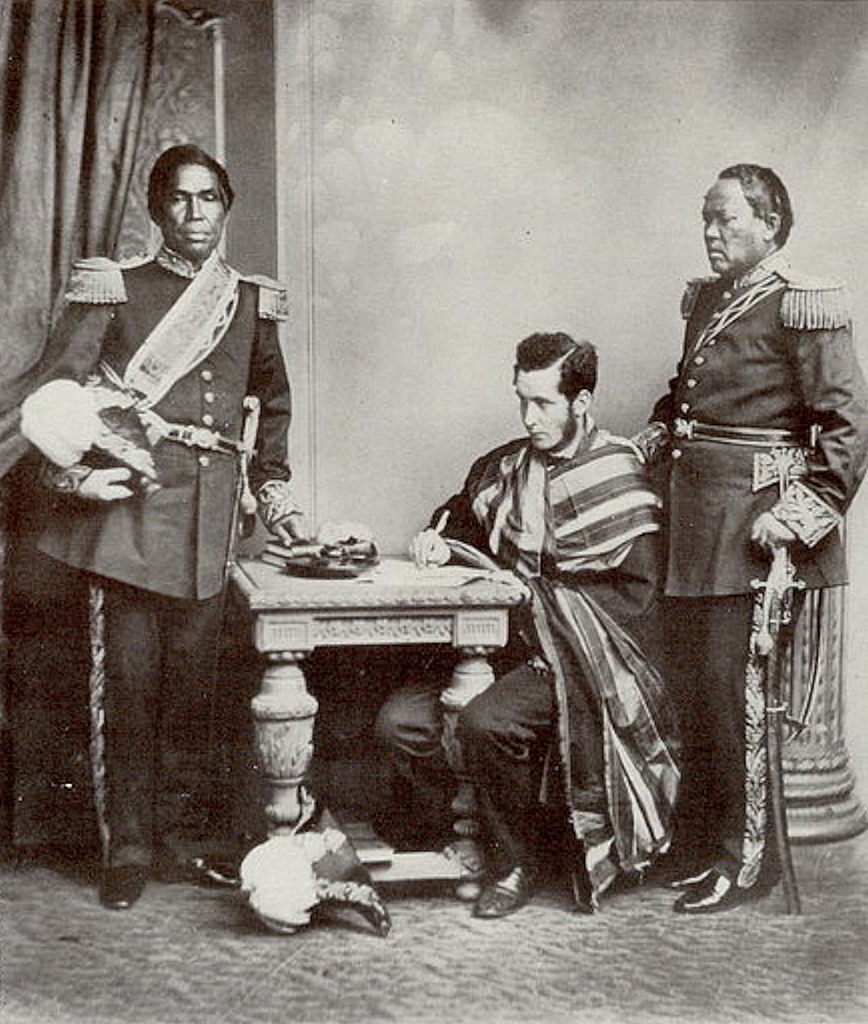
Rainifiringa Ralaimaholy and Rasatranabo aka Rainandrianandraina: Malagasy Ambassadors to Europe, 1863

During the reign of Queen Rasoherina, ambassadors were sent to London and Paris and Sunday markets were prohibited. The controversial Lambert Charter enacted by Radama II was declared void, much to the displeasure of France; a sum of 240,000 ariary (~ 1,200,000 French francs) was paid to France in reparations for the breach of this lucrative trade agreement. On 27 June 1865, she signed a treaty with the United Kingdom giving British citizens the right to rent land and property on the island and to have a resident ambassador. On 14 February 1867, she signed a treaty with the United States of America that limited the importation of weapons and the export of cattle. A treaty with France was under consideration during her reign but was not signed into effect until after her death and the succession of Ranavalona II to the throne.

== Succession conspiracy and death ==
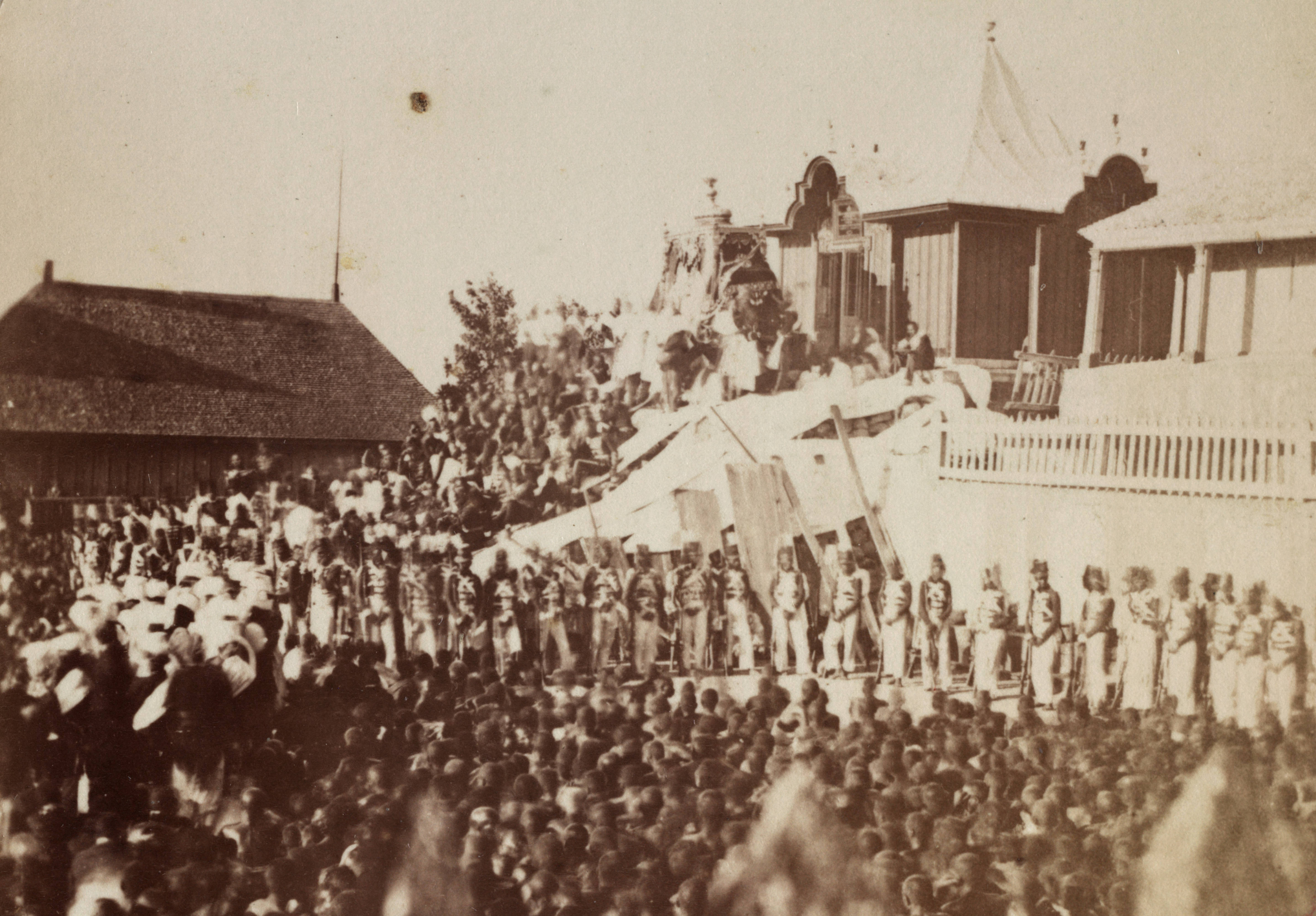
The body of Queen Rasoherina was interred in her tomb at the Rova of Antananarivo.

In the final days of the queen's life, a succession conspiracy came to light that would have removed Prime Minister Rainilaiarivony from power and ensured the succession of a prince named Rasata to the throne upon Rasoherina's death. On Friday, 27 March 1868, at two in the afternoon, a massive crowd armed with guns and swords attempted to storm the Rova of Antananarivo, residence of Queen Rasoherina. Disgraced former Prime Minister Rainivoninahitriniony was believed to be the chief instigator of the action as he would have re-established himself as prime minister and ruled through young Rasata's puppet government. The rebel group successfully captured a number of key figures, including the head of the Queen's Guard; a group of guards, however, managed to escape and raced to notify Prime Minister Rainilaiarivony who was visiting Ambohimanga where Queen Rasoherina was gravely ill from dysentery. The Prime Minister gave the order to arrest the conspirators, several of whom were promptly captured upon the soldiers' return to the city. At five in the evening, Rasoherina delivered a public address, asking those favorable to her rule to walk with her through the capital; a massive crowd paraded with her through the city, demonstrating their support for her continued authority. The queen then delivered a speech at Andohalo ordering the public to turn in any known conspirators to bring them to justice, before returning to the Rova to reassume her royal duties. The windows along the route to the palace were reportedly all ordered shut, either to protect the Queen from projectiles or to keep the nobles inhabiting the upper town from viewing the advanced state of her infirmity.

The queen died four days later, on 1 April 1868. On her deathbed, she was received into the Roman Catholic Church and conferred the care of her two orphaned adoptive children, Prince Ratahiry and Princess Rasoaveromanana, to her first cousin and successor, Ramoma, another of Radama II's wives, who would succeed her and take the throne name Ranavalona II.

== Ancestry ==
Ancestors of Rasoherina

4. Andrianavalonakelimiaina
2. Prince Andriantsalamanandriana
1. Rasoherina
12. Prince Andriantsimitovizafinitrimo
6. Prince Andriantsalamanjaka
13. Rabodomanjaka
3. Princess Rafaramanjaka
14. Prince Andriandamboranto
7. Princess Rabodonandriantompo
15. Princess Ramboakovelo

Regnal titles
Preceded by Radama II	Queen of Madagascar; 12 May 1863 – 1 April 1868	Succeeded by Ranavalona II
