= Radama II =

King of Madagascar from 1861 to 1863

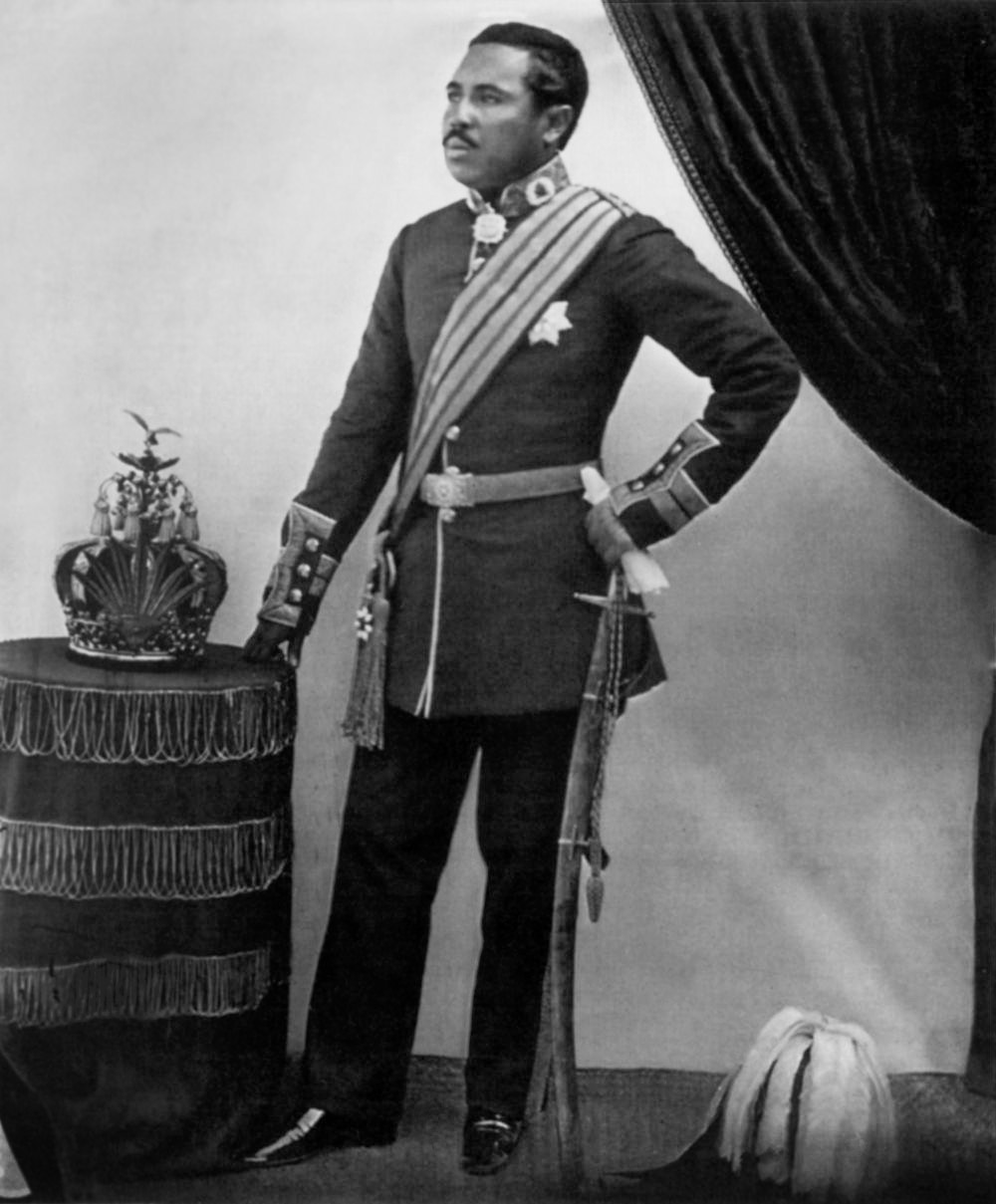
- Radama II with crown, 1861

King of Madagascar
- Reign: August 16, 1861 – May 12, 1863
- Coronation: September 23, 1862
- Predecessor: Ranavalona I
- Successor: Rasoherina
- Prime Minister: Rainivoninahitriniony
- Born: September 23, 1829; Imasoandro, Rova of Antananarivo
- Died: May 12, 1863 (aged 33) – contested Rova of Antananarivo – contested
- Burial: 1863/1897 – contested Ilafy/Tomb of the Kings, Rovan'Antananarivo – contested (re-interred)
- Spouse: Rasoherina (as Rabodo); Ranavalona II (as Ramoma); Marie Rasoamieja
- Dynasty: Hova
- Father: Andriamihaja; Radama I (officially)
- Mother: Ranavalona I

Radama II (September 23, 1829 – May 12, 1863 [contested]) was the son and heir of Queen Ranavalona I and ruled from 1861 to 1863 over the Kingdom of Madagascar, which controlled virtually the entire island. Radama's rule, although brief, was a pivotal period in the history of the Kingdom of Madagascar. Under the unyielding and often harsh 33-year rule of his mother, Queen Ranavalona I, Madagascar had successfully preserved its cultural and political independence from European colonial designs. Rejecting the queen's policy of isolationism and persecution of Christians, Radama II permitted religious freedom and re-opened Madagascar to European influence. Under the terms of the Lambert Charter, which Radama secretly contracted in 1855 with French entrepreneur Joseph-François Lambert while Ranavalona still ruled, the French were awarded exclusive rights to the exploitation of large tracts of valuable land and other lucrative resources and projects. This agreement, which was later revoked by Prime Minister Rainilaiarivony, was key to establishing France's claim over Madagascar as a protectorate and, in 1896, as a colony.

The dramatic contrast between Ranavalona's isolationism and her son's pro-European stance represented an abrupt reversal of policy that threatened the traditional sociopolitical order. Radama's absolutism in pursuing dramatic reforms in disregard of the advice of his ministers ultimately turned them against him. In a coup led by his prime minister, Rainivoninahitriniony, Radama II was strangled on May 12, 1863. His wife Rabodo, who took the throne name Rasoherina, was allowed by the ministers to succeed her husband on the condition that she and future sovereigns would no longer rule unilaterally, but rather in concert with the Hova (the class of free citizens) as represented by the position of prime minister. The public was informed that Radama had committed suicide and that his body had been unceremoniously interred in a tomb in Ilafy. However, there soon emerged rumors – believed by prominent foreigners Jean Laborde and William Ellis – that Radama lived and was making plans to reclaim the throne. A strong case has since been made on the basis of significant evidence that Radama may indeed have revived after the strangling and lived to old age in anonymity near Lake Kinkony in the northwestern part of the island.

== Upbringing and early years ==
Radama II was born Prince Rakoto (Rakotosehenondradama) on September 23, 1829, in the Imasoandro building on the compound of the Rova of Antananarivo. He was officially recognized as the son of King Radama I and his widow Queen Ranavalona I, although the king had died more than nine months before the prince's birth. He was likely fathered by a lover of his mother, Andriamihaja, a progressive young officer of the Merina army who the queen may have been tricked into putting to death by conservative ministers at court.

After his mother succeeded Radama I on the throne, she instituted an increasingly regressive regime that attempted to restore traditional values and contain or eliminate westernization. The prince, however, who had been highly influenced by the French adviser to the queen, Joseph-François Lambert, was favorably impressed by European culture, knowledge and its state of economic, political and technological development, and was troubled by some of the socially repressive policies pursued by Ranavalona I. According to a British account, the French played on this sympathy in 1855 by pressuring Prince Rakoto into signing a request for French aid that would have enabled France to establish control over Madagascar had the true nature of the letter and its signing not been uncovered by Rakoto and his British contacts. An alternate explanation was offered by Lambert, who maintained that the prince had knowingly supported the attempt to put an end to his mother's harsh policies, and was a willing collaborator in a failed 1857 plot to remove her from the throne.

Prior to Queen Ranavalona's death, the conservative and progressive factions within the Merina court waged a tactical power struggle to secure a successor favorable to their own political agenda. The conservative faction favored Ramboasalama, the son of the Queen's sister, while the Queen's prime minister, Rainivoninahitriniony and head of the army, Rainilaiarivony, brothers and progressives, supported Radama II. The latter successfully obtained key strategic allies within the court that enabled Radama to seize the throne without violence following his mother's death. Ramboasalama was obliged to swear a public oath of allegiance to Radama, and was later sent into exile in the highland village of Ambohimirimo where he died in April 1862.

== Reign ==
Prince Rakoto acceded to the throne on August 16, 1861, upon the natural death of his mother, Queen Ranavalona I, assuming the throne name Radama II. His coronation ceremony was held the following year on September 23, 1862. Once upon the throne, he immediately initiated a rapid and dramatic reversal of many of his mother's traditionalist policies. He reopened the country to foreign powers and concluded treaties of friendship with Britain and France. The Lambert Charter opened up business possibilities for French investors. Freedom of religion was declared, persecution of Christians ceased, missionaries returned to the island and their schools were reopened. Radama abolished the traditional trial by ordeal of tangena, in which the guilt or innocence of an accused person was determined based on the outcome of consuming the poison of the tangena nut, and inhabitants of Antananarivo were permitted to raise swine within the city walls, a practice previously forbidden by a fady (taboo) forbidding them from being kept near the royal talismans (sampy). The sampy were dispersed to the sacred villages where they had originated under 16th-century Merina king Ralambo and other early monarchs. Significantly, Radama freed numerous political prisoners captured under Ranavalona I during provincial wars of subjugation and offered repatriation of confiscated property. This pardon was reciprocated by many of the beneficiary ethnic groups around the island, and good will between the coasts and central administration at Antananarivo improved significantly. These changes, and the king himself, were unequivocally praised by Madagascar's European partners:

"It is most remarkable that Radama II should have formed views of policy so large and liberal, so enlightened, humane and patriotic as those which form the foundation of his throne; that the son of such a mother, trained up under a despotism so dark, and restrictive and cruel, should have adopted such principles of religious freedom and political economy, as equal civil liberty and universal free trade principles, which our own nation has been so slow to learn, and which are still repudiated in many lands where civilization is far advanced."

— Ebenezer Prout, Madagascar: Its Mission and Its Martyrs (1863)

The reaction within Imerina was less one-sided. The abrupt and dramatic policy changes pursued by the progressive king both alienated and disfranchised the established conservative factions among the andriana (nobles) and Hova (freemen) at court. Especially controversial were the special privileges accorded to Joseph-François Lambert and his partners under the Lambert Charter, including the exclusive implementation of public works projects (felling trees, making roads, building canals etc.), control over minting coinage, lucrative mining rights and more as part of the purview of Lambert's proposed Compagnie de Madagascar (French Madagascar Company). The citizens' concern stemmed primarily from clauses in the agreement that would have permitted Lambert's company to become permanent owners of Malagasy lands. Until this point, land in Madagascar, which was viewed by the populace as the sacred ground of the ancestors, could only ever be temporarily possessed by foreigners until their death, at which point the land would revert to the crown. The threat of permanently losing any part of sacred Malagasy soil to foreigners was deeply troubling. (Note: Similarly, the November 2008 agreement to lease large tracts of Malagasy land to the South Korean company Daewoo was a major factor leading to the 2009 coup d'etat that brought down the Ravalomanana administration.)

== Assassination plot ==
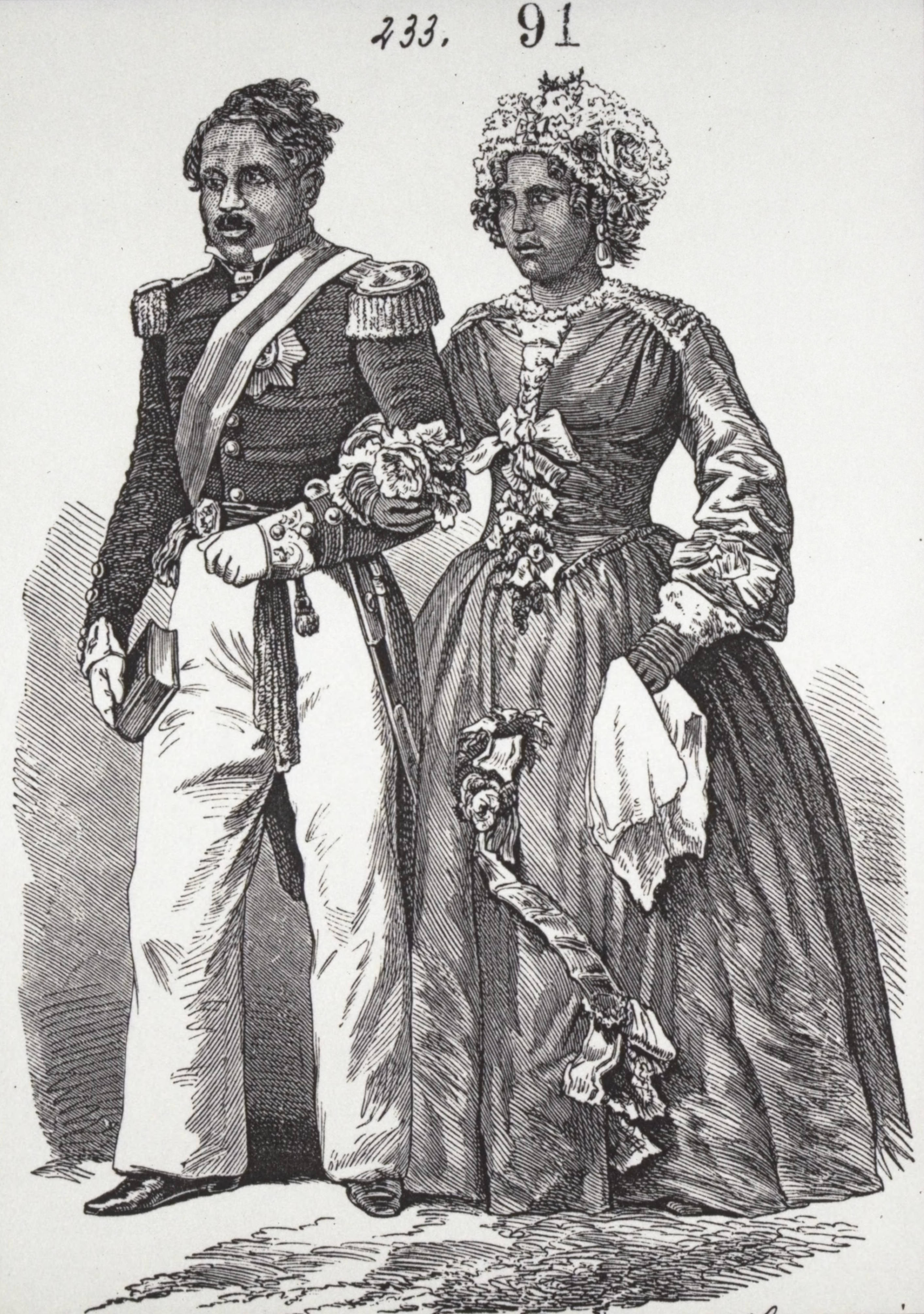
King Radama II walks with his wife Rabodo, who would become Queen Rasoherina after the coup against her husband.

The legalization of dueling was ultimately the issue that brought to a head the tension between King Radama II's entourage (mostly friends and some established political figures, known collectively as the menamaso or "red-eyes") and representatives of the opposition led by Radama's prime minister Rainivoninahitriniony. On May 7, 1863, Radama II announced his intention to allow disputes to be settled by a duel, much to the disapproval of many of his advisers at court who feared the practice would lead to anarchy. The prime minister prevented the law from being publicly declared at the Zoma (Friday) market the following day. Friday afternoon, the prime minister's younger brother, Rainilaiarivony, who was head of the army, called several thousand troops into the city to besiege a number of the menamaso and members of the royal family at the Rova palace compound, and by Saturday morning the decision had been made and carried out to execute eleven of the menamaso and other key political figures who had counseled Radama to legalize dueling. On Sunday, May 10, Rainivoninahitriniony demanded that Radama hand over the menamaso he was sheltering in the palace, which he refused to do until the prime minister agreed to spare their lives; they were handed over but by Monday morning had all been speared to death.

The drama ended on Tuesday morning, May 12, 1863, when a group of officers and soldiers forced their way into the Rova and seized the king. His wife, Queen Rabodo, pleaded for his life to be spared and attempted to stop them but was forcibly removed. The soldiers threw a lamba over Radama's head and strangled him with a silk sash until he was believed to be dead, thereby avoiding the shedding of royal blood as was the custom for royal executions in Imerina.

The nobles informed Rabodo that she would have their support as queen on the condition that she would accept to abide by certain articles that would form a new contract between rulers and ruled in Madagascar:

"For the future the word of the sovereign alone was not to be law, but that the sovereign, the nobles and the heads of the people were to unite in making the laws; that the friendship with foreigners was to be maintained; that no one was to be put to death on the word of the sovereign alone, but that the nobles and the heads of the people must concur in the sentence before it could be inflicted; that religion and worship were to be equally free to all – to natives and foreigners, to Christians and non-Christians – excepting in Ambohimanga where there should be no public worship. The ordeal of tangena was not to be used, but death should be inflicted for great crimes."

— Ebenezer Prout, Madagascar: Its Mission and Its Martyrs (1863)

Rabodo agreed to these conditions. The next morning, it was publicly announced in the marketplace that Radama had taken his own life due to grief over the deaths of his compatriots the menamaso and that Rabodo would succeed him as Queen Rasoherina. To cement the new power-sharing agreement between the ruler, the nobles and the heads of the people, a political marriage was contracted between the queen and Prime Minister Rainivoninahitriniony, who had been instrumental in her first husband's death. Radama's name was struck from the list of kings and it was declared illegal to mourn his death.

== Rumors of survival ==
Following Radama II's apparent death, rumors spread that he had only been rendered unconscious by the attempt on his life and had revived as his body was being transported to Ilafy for interment in his designated tomb. French historian Delval presents evidence that supports a scenario wherein the group tasked with carrying Radama's body to Ilafy became frightened as the king began to revive, prompting them to abandon the body and then falsely maintain that they had completed their task to place him in the tomb. Within months after his reported death, rumors began circulating that Radama was alive, residing on the west coast of the island and was amassing supporters for a political comeback. The rumors persisted to the point of causing political turmoil in Antananarivo. These claims may have had some substance judging by the actions of others. Prominent Christian missionaries outside the capital made extensive efforts to visit and support Radama but seemingly never succeeded. Traditionalist factions within the government were concerned enough by the rumors to have put to death sixteen of his supporters, as well as fining hundreds of others. According to evidence in Delval's study, Radama may indeed have survived and, failing to regain the throne, lived to old age as an ordinary citizen in the north of the island.

With the apparent murder of Radama II, the power of the Merina monarchs was broken. Subsequent monarchs were controlled by influential Hova, particularly Rainilaiarivony, who became prime minister after his brother and successively married all three remaining queens of the monarchy: Rasoherina, Ranavalona II and Ranavalona III.

== Bibliography ==
- Ade Ajayi, Jacob Festus (1989). Africa in the Nineteenth Century until the 1880s. Paris: UNESCO. ISBN 9780520039179.
- Brown, Mervyn (2002). A History of Madagascar. New York: Markus Wiener Publishers.
- Chapus, G.S.; Mondain, G. (1953). Un homme d'etat malgache: Rainilaiarivony (in French). Paris: Editions Diloutremer.
- De La Vaissière, Camille (1884). Histoire de Madagascar: ses habitants et ses missionnaires, Volume 1 (in French). Paris: Victor Lecoffre.
- Delval, Raymond (1972). Radama II, prince de la renaissance malgache: 1861–1863 (in French). Paris: Éditions de l'École.
- Oliver, Samuel (1886). Madagascar: An Historical and Descriptive Account of the Island and its Former Dependencies, Volume 1. New York: Macmillan and Co.
- Pfeiffer, Ida (1861). The last travels of Ida Pfeiffer: inclusive of a visit to Madagascar. London: Harper.
- Prout, Ebenezer (1863). Madagascar: Its Mission and Its Martyrs. London: London Missionary Society. Archived from the original on June 28, 2011.

Regnal titles
Preceded by Ranavalona I	King of Madagascar; August 16, 1861 – May 12, 1863	Succeeded by Rasoherina
