= John Davies (Congregationalist minister, born 1804) =

Welsh Congregational Minister, writer, linguist and poet

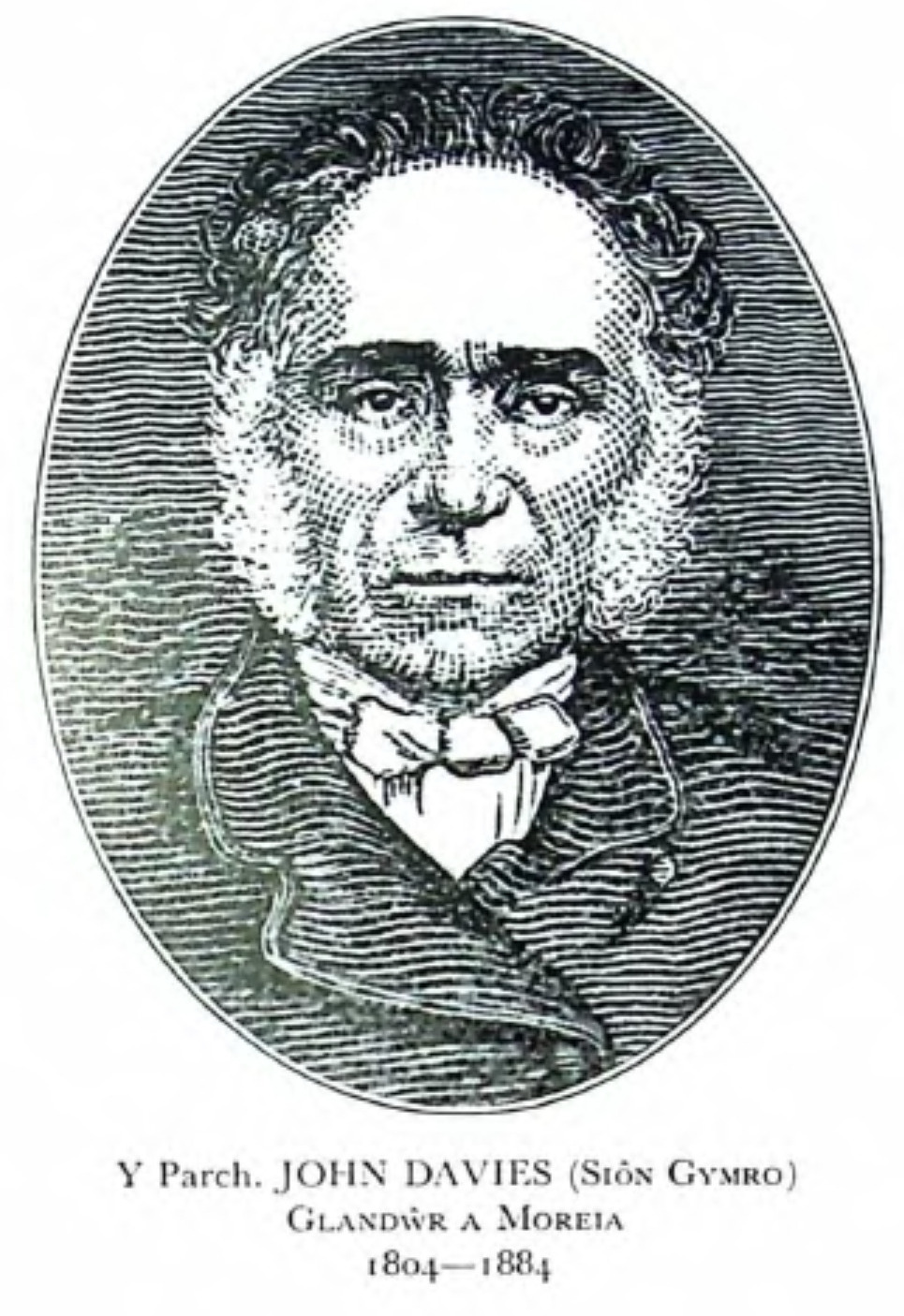
John Davies (Siôn Gymro)

The Reverend John Davies (5 March 1804 – 16 December 1884) was a Welsh Congregational Minister, writer, linguist and poet. One source has Davies' date of death listed as 10 December 1884, separately noting that it was his funeral service that was conducted on 16 December 1884.

Davies, son of David and Mary, was born at Bwlch-yr-helygen, Cardiganshire. His parents relocated shortly after his birth to a nearby farm called Castell-y-geifr (The castle of the goats), Powys, Wales. Davies died in 1884 at the age of 81, leaving his vast collection of personal essays and poetry with the Congregational Minister and Historian - John Lloyd James (Clwydwenfro), one of Davies' former pupils.

== Education ==
Davies' father had an above-average education, and was Davies's first teacher. Davies entered formal education at age 7, enrolling at the school at Neuaddlwyd near Aberayron. His education at Neuaddlwyd was largely religious, with the school being primarily aimed toward producing preachers and ministers, rather than academic scholars. Davies's teacher was the school's headmaster, the Congregational minister Thomas Phillips (1772 - 1842). Davies was here when the first Welsh missionaries left Wales for Madagascar, namely, David Jones and Thomas Bevan, who Davies later regarded as ministerial colleagues.

In 1822, at age 18, he was accepted into the Independent Academy at Newtown under the care of Edward Davies, Davies' fellow pupils were David Rees and Samuel Roberts. It was here that Davies mastered the elements of Hebrew, Syriac, Aramaic, Greek, Latin and divinity. General literacy was typically reserved at this time for the wealthy and the clergy.

== Career ==
Davies accepted an invitation to Glandwr Welsh Independent Chapel, Pembrokeshire, on 6 months probation, and was ordained into the parish on 28 March 1827. Two years later, in 1829, he founded Moreia Welsh Independent Chapel in Blaenwaun, one of the five villages of Llanwinio parish, Carmarthenshire, Despite this, he remained at Glandwr until 1863. Upon leaving Glandwr after 35 years of service, Davies transferred to Moreiah (Moreia Welsh Independent) church, where he remained until he died. He served as chairman of the Union of Welsh Independents from 1873.

== Personal life ==
Davies married Phoebe Griffiths (granddaughter of John Griffiths) on 22 July 1833. Phoebe fell ill and died on 16 September 1844. They had four children, all of whom died early. First was his youngest child, David, who died aged five on 4 October 1848. He was fatally wounded by a falling stone after climbing through a gap in a cobblestone wall. He was buried at Moriah.

Elizabeth Davies died on 20 February 1859, at the age of 19. She suffered from a burst blood vessel during a severe cold, and later died following a short illness. Like her brother David, she was also buried at Moriah.

Mary Anne Davies died shortly after giving birth to her first child on 10 January 1860, at the age of 26. She was buried at Penycae, near Llanarth. Mary Anne left behind her baby boy, named David Jones, who was then cared for by an aunt and uncle at Wern Mill.

Davies lost his last child, John Griffith Davies, on 14 March 1861, aged 25 years. He was blown from the mast-head of the ship Hibernia, after passing the Liverpool lightship. Despite a long search, his body was never found. The Hibernia was travelling from Liverpool to New Brunswick.

== Publications ==
His published works include poems, songs, scriptural translations and Welsh literary essays. His better known work, "Notes on the Minor Prophets (Y Proffwydi Byrion)" was an original translation into Welsh from Hebrew (with marginal Latin), Syriac and Greek readings. The translation is considered to be his greatest feat; the result of forty years of research and labour. Davies' other papers include translations - Llyfr Coheleth and Llyfr Hosea; Lectures on St. Peter's Epistles, Horae Petrinae (Darlithau ar epistolau Pedr), and a collection of his own original verse and poetry - Flores Poeticae (casgliad o'i farddoniaeth).

Publications include:

- Cyfieithiad o'r Testament Newydd, MSS
- Llethi Afonig Llanarth, Castell Newydd Emlyn : J.R Davies, 1868 34 t.
- Flores Poetici (casgliad o'i farddoniaeth), n.d.
- Horae Petrinae (Darlithau ar epistolau Pedr) n.d.
- Penillion ar glywed y Fronfraith yn canu gerllaw. Chef. 2, 1865, Aberteifi : D.W. Thomas, Argraffydd. 4 t.
- Proffwyd Byrion 1881 (o'r Hebraeg). Cyf. Gan John Davies, Llandeilo : D.W.a G. Jones, 1881 vi, 219 t.
- Purdeb y weinidogaeth, h.d.

Publications about John Davies:

- Davies, Ben: Sion Gymro, Gomer, (1938). 106 t.
- Evans, D: Gwaith oes yr Hybarch John Davies, Moreia. DYSG, (1925) t.142-144.
- Rees, T.M: Notable Welshmen 1700 - 1900 (1908).
- Eminent Welshmen, A Short Biographical Dictionary of Welshmen who Have Attained Distinction from the Earliest Times to the Present (1852).

Davies' personal letters have been used to show how instances of Welsh evolved over time and potentially influenced the English language.

== The Davies Manuscripts ==
The National Library of Wales houses the Davies collection, comprising over 70 items of personal correspondence, essays, diaries, sermons, translations of segments of the New Testament, with commentaries, poetry, lectures, almanacs, and miscellaneous papers. In addition to the Davies collection is the Album of 'Clwydwenfro', assembled by one of Davies' pupils and admirers, the Reverend John Lloyd James (Clwydwenfro). The album contains hundreds of items pertaining to the life and death of John Davies, the majority of which are letters, books, proposals, church records, sermons, poetry and music. The collection was provided to the National Library of Wales by Mr J. Davies Jones, Beulah, Cardiganshire, a descendant of John Davies, in 1933.

== Pseudonyms in publications ==
Davies used a number of pseudonyms in his writings. His best-known pseudonym was Shôn Gymro (or Siôn), which translates in Welsh to "John Welshman", a typically generic name for what may be deemed to be a hypothetical and average, male Welshman. Other names used in his writings were Castellanus (sometimes believed spelled Castellamis), often used with his English correspondence, and Shôn Llethi (or Siôn), used when writing in Welsh. While "Shôn Gymro" is regarded to be his better known pseudonym for Welsh writing, Shon Llethi may have originally served as a nickname for more personal affairs, before also evolving into a pseudonym for which he would sign his poetry and essays that were submitted to local newspapers. Davies' official name recorded with the Cardiganshire local council at the time of his death was "John Glandwr Davies", suggesting that Davies was also known with the additional middle name "Glandwr", the town in which he held a ministerial role at the local parish. A lesser familiar pseudonym he used was De Castello. Davies' pseudonyms were revealed publicly long after his death in a newspaper article submitted by his friend and student, John Lloyd James (Clwydwenfro).
