= David Griffiths (missionary) =

Welsh Christian missionary (1792–1863)

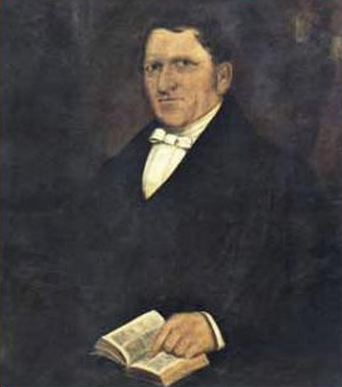
- Born: 20 December 1792
- Died: 21 March 1863 (aged 70)

David Griffiths (20 December 1792 – 21 March 1863), was a Welsh Christian missionary and translator in Madagascar. He translated the Bible and other books into the Malagasy language. The Malagasy Bible of 1835 was among the first Bibles to be printed in an African language.

== Life and work ==
David Griffiths was born on 20 December 1792 at Cwmhirbryd cottage and reared at nearby Glanmeilwch, Llangadog, Carmarthenshire, in south Wales. He was the son of William Griffith David and his wife Elizabeth. He became a member of the neighbouring Jerusalem Congregational church at Gwynfe in 1810 and soon after began to preach. He conducted a school of his own at Cwmaman in 1811–12. He entered the college at Neuaddlwyd 1812.

He married Mary Griffiths in May 1820. In June 1820, he was sent to Madagascar by the London Missionary Society, as colleague of the Reverend David Jones, who had gone out two years previously. On 27 July he was ordained at Gwynfe and on 25 October sailed with his wife from London. They reached Mauritius on 23 January 1821 and soon afterwards proceeded to Madagascar. Griffiths and Jones founded the first Protestant mission in Madagascar. They preached twice every Sunday and established day and night schools, his wife teaching the girls. In 1824, the schools in the capital numbered 300 scholars, and there were 32 other schools within the country, all of which he visited weekly. Griffiths and Jones, with King Radama I devised a Roman-letter alphabet for Malagasy; in 1827 a printing press was obtained, and the following year a catechism, a hymnal, and some schoolbooks were published in Malagasy, and the printing of the Gospel of St. Luke was begun.

In 1828 King Radama I of Madagascar, who had been a friend of the Christian missionaries, died at age 36. A period of confusion followed, and the mission's work was for a time interrupted. In 1830 night-schools, however, were opened for the lowest classes, and the work of the mission generally was continued with success. In 1831, the New Testament was published in Malagasy, and a large part of the Old Testament; the first Bible to be published in an African language. But in the same year the mission experienced many new difficulties. Although the Queen of Madagascar, Ranavalona I, was favourable to the work, her ministers were opposed to it, and the missionaries were ordered to leave. But this order was cancelled, and from 1832 to 1835 the mission was continued successfully.

In 1835, however, a fierce anti-Christian persecution arose, and the missionaries decided to leave. Griffiths preached his last sermon in the chapel on 22 February, and left the island in September 1835, reaching Britain in February 1836. At the end of two years he received an intimation from Ranavalona that he might return as a merchant but not as a missionary. He did so in May 1838. Persecution still raged throughout the island, and Griffiths was charged with having helped some Malagasy Christians to leave the country and was sentenced to death, a sentence afterwards commuted to payment of a fine. Griffiths' Persecuted Christians of Madagascar was published in London in 1841. Whilst in Madagascar, Griffiths also travelled to the Comoros Islands, where he met Queen Jumbe-Souli who ruled the independent island of Moheli.

He returned to Britain in 1842 and settled as pastor of the congregational church at Hay-on-Wye, Brecknockshire, where he wrote Hanes Madagascar (English: History of Madagascar). While at Hay-on-Wye, he formed a new congregation over the English border, at Kington, Herefordshire. About 1850, some hopes being raised of renewing the mission in Madagascar, the London Missionary Society asked Griffiths and Joseph John Freeman, the only surviving Madagascar missionaries, to revise the Malagasy translation of the Bible. Freeman died in 1851, and the whole work devolved upon Griffiths, who spent some five years on it. In 1854, he wrote a Malagasy grammar. Griffiths also wrote some catechisms, a hymn-book, and nine or ten original treatises. He also revised many works already translated, e.g. the 'Pilgrim's Progress,' the 'Whole Bible,' and dictionaries. In 1858 he moved to Machynlleth, where he busied himself in preparing for the press a grammar and other works in Malagasy.

== Death and legacy ==
He died on 21 March 1863 at Machynlleth, where he was buried.

He had eight children by his wife, who died at Swansea on 15 July 1883, aged 93. One of his daughters, Margaret Jane (1830-1873), married the missionary and translator Griffith John (1831-1912), and worked with him in China at Hankou, with much travel in China until her death at Singapore on 24 March 1873 when both were returning to China after furlough in the United Kingdom to recover their health.
