= Andriamihaja =

Prime minister of Madagascar (died 1831)

1st Prime Minister of Madagascar
- In office 1828–1831
- Monarch: Ranavalona I
- Succeeded by: Rainiharo

Personal details
- Born: Madagascar
- Died: 1831
- Resting place: Namehana, Madagascar
- Children: Radama II

Andriamihaja, also spelled Andrìamihàja (died 1831), was the first Prime Minister of Madagascar. He was a supporter of Ranavalona I and as a young military officer he was instrumental in her rise. He came to be functionally viewed as her husband, and with her he fathered Radama II. He was executed in 1831.

== Early life ==
Andriamihaja's father is thought to have been Ratsitatanina, who led a slave rebellion in Mauritius and was executed in 1822.

Andriamihaja was a military officer, who commanded forces in the mid-1820s. As a young officer he became an ally of queen Ranavalona I, and he supported her as the successor to Radama I following his death. His support from within the military was an important part of Ranavalona I's rise to power.

== Political career ==
When Ranavalona I became the sovereign, Andriamihaja was quickly appointed as her prime minister, as well as commander in chief of the military. He was also a close advisor to the queen. Some sources consider Andriamihaja to be the second or third chief minister of Ranavalona I, possibly succeeding Andrianamba as the leading minister to Ranavalona I, but Andriamihaja is often described as the first person to hold the position of prime minister or chief minister in Madagascar. The date of his selection is variously given as either 1828 or 1830.

Andriamihaja has been described as a reformer who was sympathetic to education expansion efforts. He was also a convert to Christianity, and was considered a proponent of Europeanisation.

Andriamihaja was one of the lovers of Ranavalona I, and after her accession he was sometimes viewed as functionally being her husband. Andriamihaja was the father of Radama II. Reportedly because of Andriamihaja's rapid rise in power from being a young military commander to becoming a primary advisor to the queen, a group of his rivals including Rainiharo and Rainiseheno accused him of treason, resulting in his execution on the orders of Ranavalona I in 1831. At first, Ranavalona I only expelled him from court and stripped him of his positions, but after it was alleged that he had begun an affair with a princess, she ordered his execution. Andriamihaja's support for the European powers is also thought to have been used as an instrument by his opponents to provoke his downfall.

Andriamihaja was buried at Namehana in Madagascar.
