= David Jones (missionary) =

British missionary and linguist

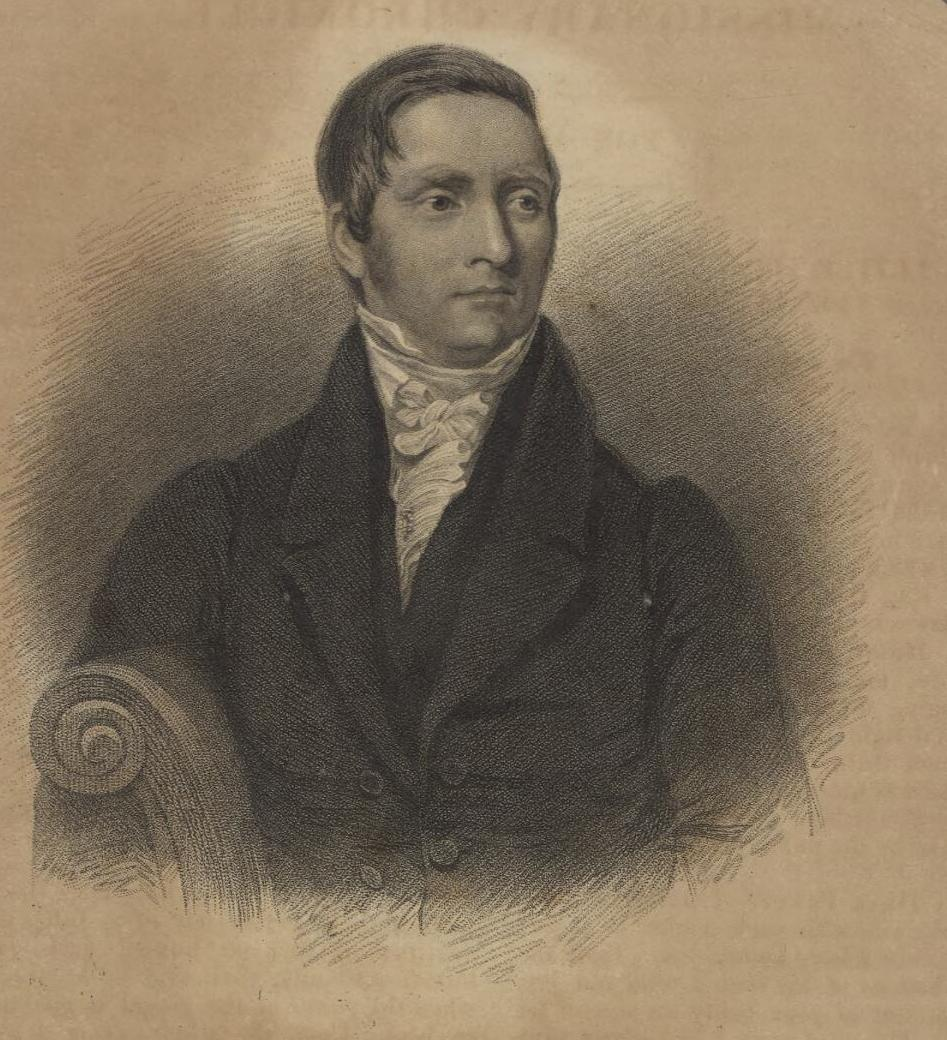
Portrait of David Jones in 1833

David Jones (July 1796 – 1 May 1841) was a pioneering Christian missionary to Madagascar. A gifted linguist, he was noted for establishing the orthography of the Malagasy language and for his translation of the Bible into Malagasy, a work that he undertook with fellow missionary David Griffiths.

== Life and work ==
David Jones was born in Penrhiw, near Neuaddlwyd, Cardiganshire. He studied under Thomas Phillips at the Neuaddlwyd Academy and later at Llanfyllin.

At 16, he offered himself for service with the London Missionary Society (LMS) and was sent to Gosport for training, with his friend Thomas Bevan. He was ordained at Neuaddlwyd on 20 and 21 August 1817. He married Lucy Darby, born 31 March 1795 of Chipping Campden, Gloucestershire to father John Tomes Darby and mother Ann Acox, Darby's second, and he would move from Gloucestershire to Alverstoke Parish in Gosport after about 1801; it was here on 27 December 1817 that Jones married Lucy Darby. Lucy Jones died in 1818 along with her baby daughter Anna. When David Jones first arrived in Port Louis in 1818, he and Lucy lodged with the family of Jean Joseph Mabille, and baby Anna was born at Maison Mabille 24 August 1818. David Jones would have met at this time Anne Marie Mabille the lady who became his 2nd wife on 20 July 1821, in Port Louis; they would name their first child born about 1823 in Madagascar Lucy. David Jones would maintain a lifelong association with Lucy Darby's family in Gosport. David Jones and Marie Anne Mabille would have five children including Lucy their first, who was named after his first wife who had died soon after they arrived in Madagascar. David Jones & Marie Anne Mabille, his wife, were in Montgomeryshire, Wales visiting various Parishes for fundraising for the Madagacar Mission when their son John David Jones was born there on 3 March 1832.

Directed by the LMS to serve in Madagascar, Jones and Bevan with their families landed at Tamatave from Mauritius in September 1818. There, he was laid low with malaria, from which his first wife and child died. Bevan and his wife and child also died.

He gave himself to educational and religious work among the Malagasy population, opening a number of schools. He settled at Antananarivo in 1820. By 1828, there were 37 schools, 44 teachers, and 2,309 students. A "Malagasy Schooling Society" was established, and King Radama I took great personal interest in it. In consultation with the king, Jones devised an orthographic system for the Malagasy language.

In conjunction with David Griffiths, Jones translated the Bible into Malagasy. With the help of David Johns, he also published a spelling book, a catechism and a hymnary.

Following the death of King Radama I, Christianity in Madagascar was banned in 1835 under Queen Ranavalona I, with some Christians being martyred. Jones returned to Mauritius, which he used as a base for evangelisation. Suffering from malaria, he died there in 1841.

== Works by David Jones ==
- Abstract of a Journey of Mr. David Jones, Missionary at Madagascar, Containing a Brief Account of his Journey to the Capital of Radama, &c. Transactions of the London Missionary Society, October 1821.

== Biographies ==
- William Edward Cousins, David Jones: The Pioneer of Protestant Missions in Madagascar. London: London Missionary Society, c.1908.
- Ernest Henry Hayes, David Jones: Founder of the Church in Madagascar. London: Capsey, 1933.
- Joyce Reason, Storm over Madagascar: David Jones. London: Carrgate Press, 1937.
