= Tangena =

Trial by ordeal using toxic plant in Madagascar

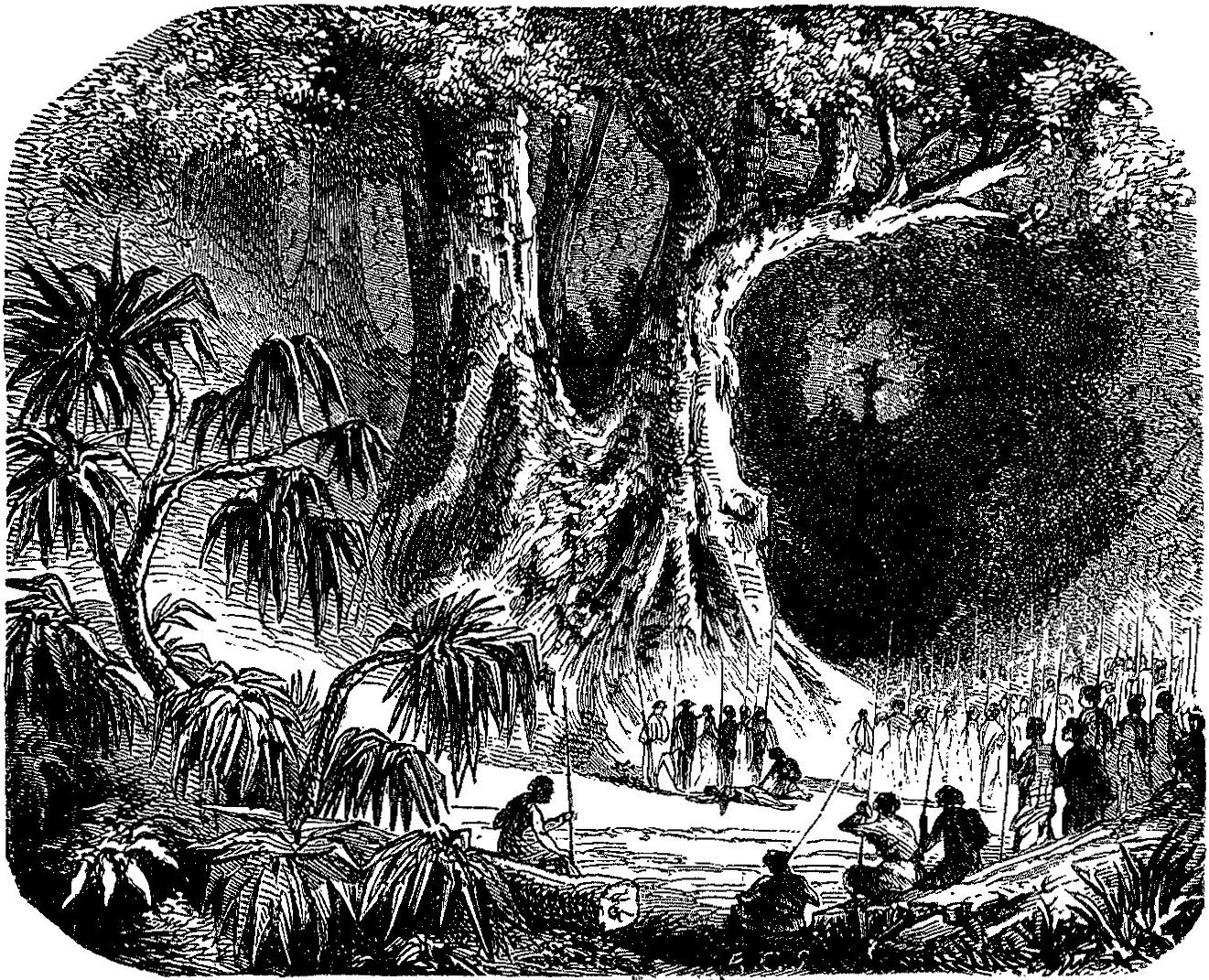
A 19th-century artist's depiction of tangena being performed in a forest glade in Madagascar

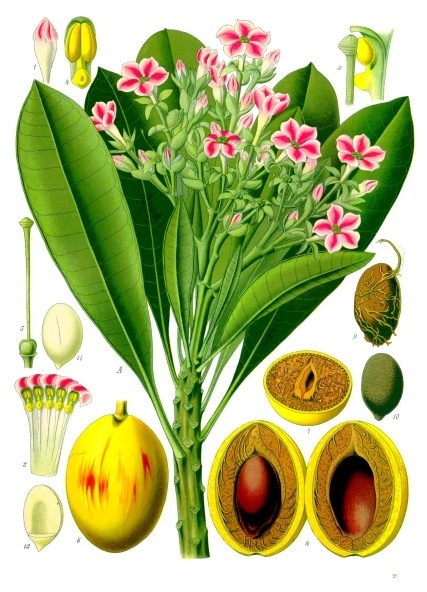
Cerbera manghas (known formerly as Cerbera tanghin), showing plum-like fruit, halved to reveal toxic seed - as depicted in a coloured plate from Köhler's Medizinal Pflanzen

Tangena was a form of trial by ordeal practiced in Madagascar to determine the guilt or innocence of an accused party. The trial utilized seeds of the tree species Cerbera manghas (family Apocynaceae), which produces seeds that contain highly toxic cardiac glycosides including cerberin and tanghinin.

Tangena dates back to at least the 16th century in Imerina. It has been estimated that the poison may have been responsible for the deaths of as much as 2% of the population of the central province of Madagascar each year on average. Mortality peaked during the reign of Queen Ranavalona I (1828–1861), when the tangena ordeal was used extensively.

The belief in the genuineness and accuracy of tangena was so strongly held among all that innocent people suspected of an offence did not hesitate to subject themselves to it; some even showed eagerness to be tested. The use of ritual poison in Madagascar was abolished in 1863 by King Radama II, but its use persisted for at least several decades after being officially banned.

== Etymology ==
Tangena - designating both the plant and the ordeal in which it was used - is derived from a word in the official (highland) dialect of the Malagasy language, tangaina, meaning "swearing" or "oath taking".

== History ==
The precise dates and origins of the tangena ordeal on Madagascar are unknown. The 19th century transcription of Merina oral history, Tantara ny Andriana eto Madagasikara, references the use of tangena by the Merina king Andrianjaka (1612–1630), describing a change in its practice: rather than administering tangena poison to an accused person's rooster to determine their innocence by the creature's survival, the poison would instead be ingested by the accused himself. By Andrianjaka's time, the ordeal was already a well-established and respected form of traditional justice, suggesting the practice must have originated no later than the 16th century.

In the early 19th century, tangena constituted one of the chief measures by which Queen Ranavalona maintained order within her realm. A poison was extracted from the nut of the native tangena tree and ingested, with the outcome determining innocence or guilt. Although many versions of the ordeal were practiced, the basic procedure involved feeding the accused three pieces of chicken skin, followed by a mixture of the poison and leaves or juice from banana or the cardamom plant.

If all three pieces of skin were vomited up then innocence was declared, but death or a failure to regurgitate all three pieces of skin indicated guilt. If nobles (andriana) or freemen (hova) were compelled to undergo the ordeal, the poison was typically administered to the accused only after dog and rooster stand-ins had already died from the poison's effects, while among members of the slave class (andevo), the ordeal required them to immediately ingest the poison themselves. According to custom, the families of the dead were not permitted to bury them within the family tomb, but rather had to inter them in the ground at a remote, inhospitable location, with the head of the corpse turned to the south (a mark of dishonor).

It has been reported that the chicken skin was a symbolic representation of human flesh, which was believed to be consumed by those controlled by evil spirits, thus the retention of chicken skin would indicate that one must consume human flesh. According to 19th-century Malagasy historian Raombana, in the eyes of the greater populace, the tangena ordeal was believed to represent a sort of celestial justice in which the public placed their unquestioning faith, even to the point of accepting a verdict of guilt in a case of innocence as a just but unknowable divine mystery. The nut of the tangena plant was reportedly believed to contain a spirit known as Manamango that could contribute to determining the guilt or innocence of a person.

Residents of Madagascar could accuse one another of various crimes, including theft, Christianity and especially witchcraft, for which the ordeal of tangena was routinely obligatory. On average, an estimated 20 to 50 percent of those who underwent the ordeal died. In the 1820s, the tangena ordeal caused about 1,000 deaths annually. This average rose to around 3,000 annual deaths between 1828 and 1861. In 1838, it was estimated that as many as 100,000 people in Imerina died as a result of the tangena ordeal, constituting roughly 20 percent of the population.

The tangena ordeal was outlawed in 1863 by Radama II. Furthermore, Radama decreed that those who had died from the tangena ordeal would no longer be considered guilty of sorcery, and their bodies could once again be buried in family tombs. This decree was hailed with joy and prompted mass re-interments, as nearly every family in mid-19th century Imerina had lost at least one family member in a tangena ordeal. Despite this royal decree, the practice continued secretly in Imerina and openly in other parts of the island. One of the key conditions that Radama's widow, Rasoherina, was obliged to accept by her ministers before they would agree to her succession, was continued adherence to the abolishment of the tangena ordeal.

== Toxicology ==
Cerbera manghas has been determined to contain various cardiac glycosides, which principally consisted of tanghinin, deactyltanghinin, neriifolin, and cerberin. These molecules can cause bradycardia and eventually cardiac arrest by affecting sodium-potassium pumps in cardiac muscle cells.

Although all parts of the Cerbera manghas plant are poisonous, the most toxic parts of the plant, the nuts, were used during the tangena ordeals. It was widely believed among the Malagasy that the various foods and drinks consumed during the ritual could alter the toxicity of the nuts, and so only a certain group of "witch doctors" were allowed to carry out the trial. Cardiac glycosides from the Cerbera manghas plant are known to be able to induce nausea and vomiting, although these symptoms can take over an hour to manifest. As such, people undertaking the trial were often found guilty and killed before the poison could fully take effect.
