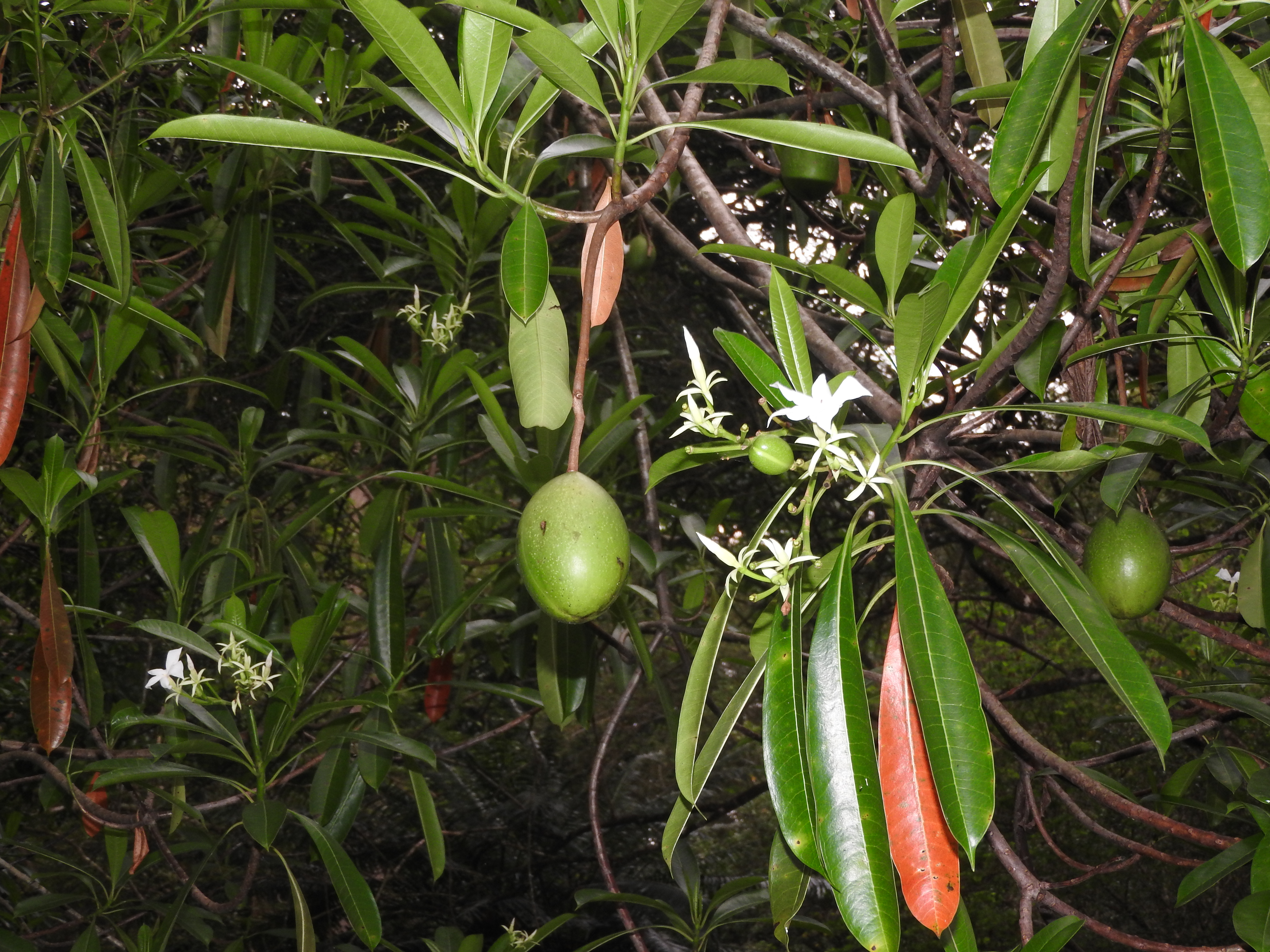

Conservation status
- Least Concern (IUCN 3.1)

Scientific classification
- Kingdom: Plantae
- Clade: Tracheophytes
- Clade: Angiosperms
- Clade: Eudicots
- Clade: Asterids
- Order: Gentianales
- Family: Apocynaceae
- Genus: Cerbera
- Species: C. manghas

Binomial name
- Cerbera manghas L.

Synonyms
- Synonyms list: Cerbera linnaei Montrouz.; Cerbera manghas var. acutisperma Boiteau; Cerbera manghas f. luteola Boiteau; Cerbera manghas var. mugfordii (F.M.Bailey) Domin; Cerbera odollam var. mugfordii F.M.Bailey; Cerbera tanghin Hook.; Cerbera venenifera (Poir.) Steud.; Elcana seminuda Blanco; Odollamia manghas (L.) Raf.; Odollamia moluca Raf.; Tabernaemontana obtusifolia Poir.; Tanghinia manghas (L.) G.Don; Tanghinia veneneflua G.Don; Tanghinia venenifera Poir.

= Cerbera manghas =

Species of plant

Cerbera manghas (formerly Cerbera tanghin), commonly known as the sea mango, wawai, pink-eyed cerbera, tangena or bintaro is a small evergreen coastal tree growing up to 12 metres (39 ft) tall. It is native to coastal areas in Africa, Asia, Australasia, and the Pacific islands. It is classified as one of the three species in the genus Cerbera that constitute mangroves. Despite its name, it is not closely related to the mango (Mangifera indica).

== Description ==
The shiny dark-green leaves grow in a spiral arrangement, and are ovoid in shape. The flowers are fragrant, possessing a white tubular five-lobed corolla about 3–5 cm (1.2–2.0 in) in diameter, with a pink to red throat. They have five stamens and the ovary is positioned above the other flower parts. The fruits are egg-shaped, 5–10 cm (2.0–3.9 in) long. At maturity they turn bright red.

== Toxicity ==
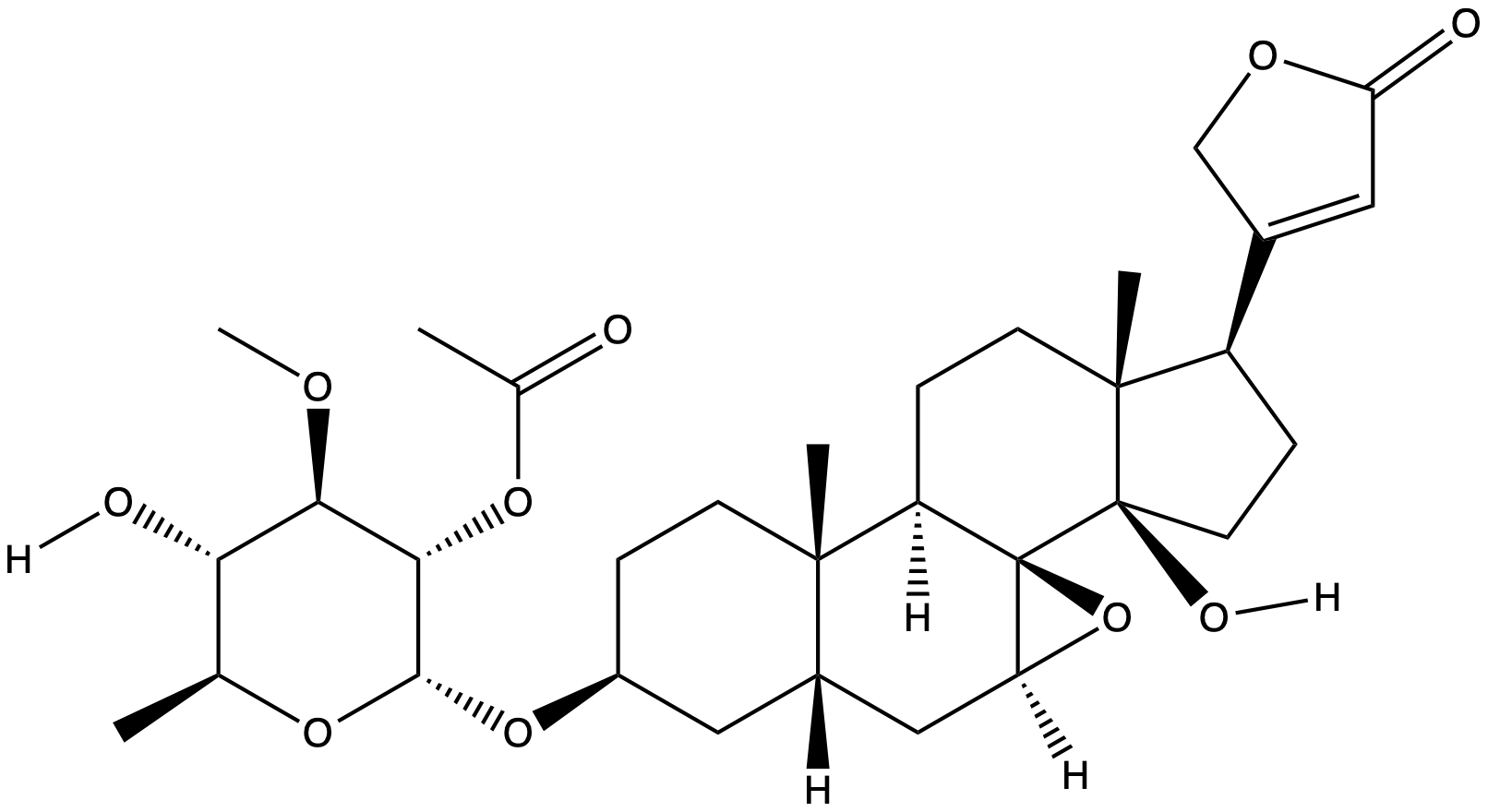
Tanghinin, one of the toxins present in Cerbera manghas.

The leaves and the fruits contain the extremely toxic cardiac glycoside cerberin, as well as tanghinin, deactyltanghin, and neriifolin. Only the mechanism of action for cerberin has been extensively studied, although tanghinin and the other molecules are likely to proceed through a similar mechanism. Cerberin acts by affecting sodium-potassium pumps in cardiac muscle cells via inhibition of Na^{+}/K^{+}-ATPase. In addition to its cardiac effects, symptoms of poisoning include numbness in the upper extremities followed by nausea, vomiting, chest tightness, and dyspnea. Cerberin is believed to be the most important contributor to the toxicity of the plant, although it is found in lower quantities than the other cardiac glycosides. Like the closely related Cerbera odollam, C. manghas seeds have been purposely ingested in suicide attempts.

Treatment of poisoning by Cerbera manghas is similar to treatment for digoxin poisoning. Administrations of calcium gluconate in moderation has been shown to be effective at reducing hyperkalemia.

More modern medical research indicates that the cerberin found in the plant might have favorable properties for chemotherapy as the cardiac glycoside might be able to selectively induce apoptosis in tumor cells.

Goffin's cockatoo is one of the creatures known to eat sea mangos. In addition, the coconut crab can become toxic to humans if it eats too much sea mango due to a buildup of cardiac cardenolides.

== Historical uses ==
During the Merina Kingdom's rule of the island of Madagascar, Cerbera manghas was used in tangena trials by ordeal to test suspected criminals and witches. Poison from nuts of the plant would be consumed in combination with three strips of chicken, and if the chicken was not vomited, then the person would be found guilty and executed. The use of the plant peaked during the reign of Queen Ranavalona I, where it was estimated that over 100,000 people were killed. The tangena ordeal was eventually banned during the reign of Radama II.

On the opposite spectrum, Fijians use its (vasa, rewa) leaves in dried form to treat skin irritations and eye pains.

Long ago, people used the sap of the tree as a poison for animal hunting.

== Gallery ==
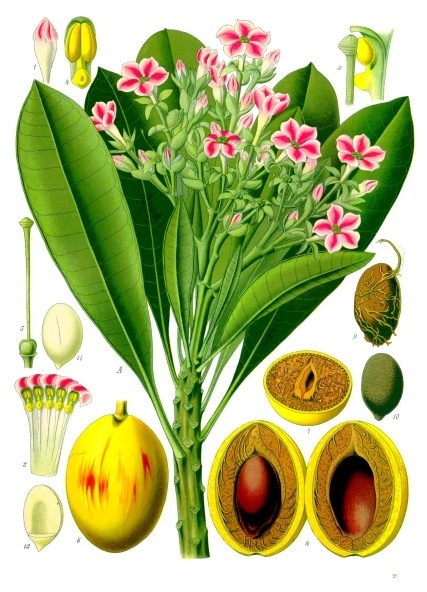
Colorized plate showing the halved fruits containing the toxic seeds

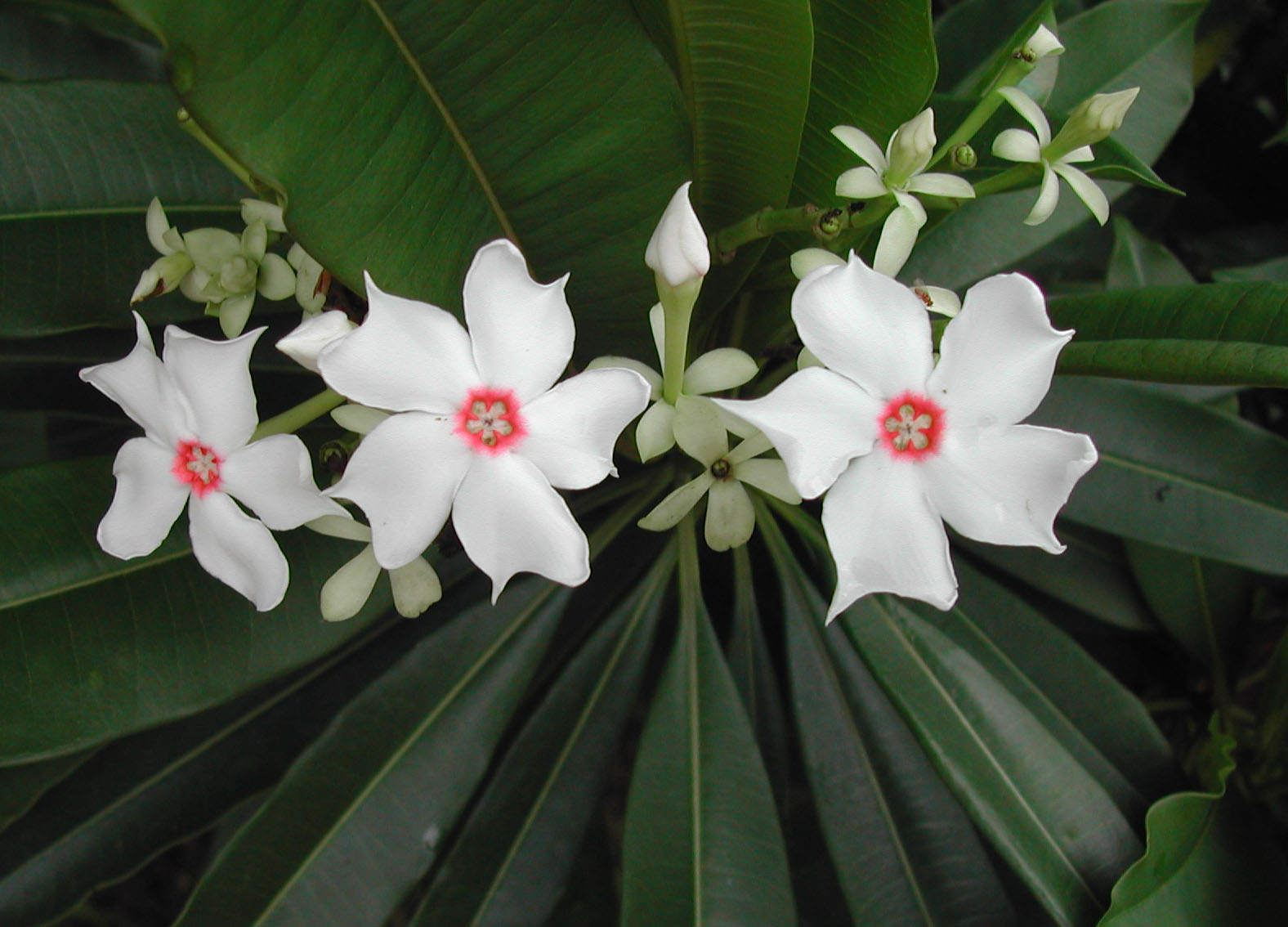
Flower

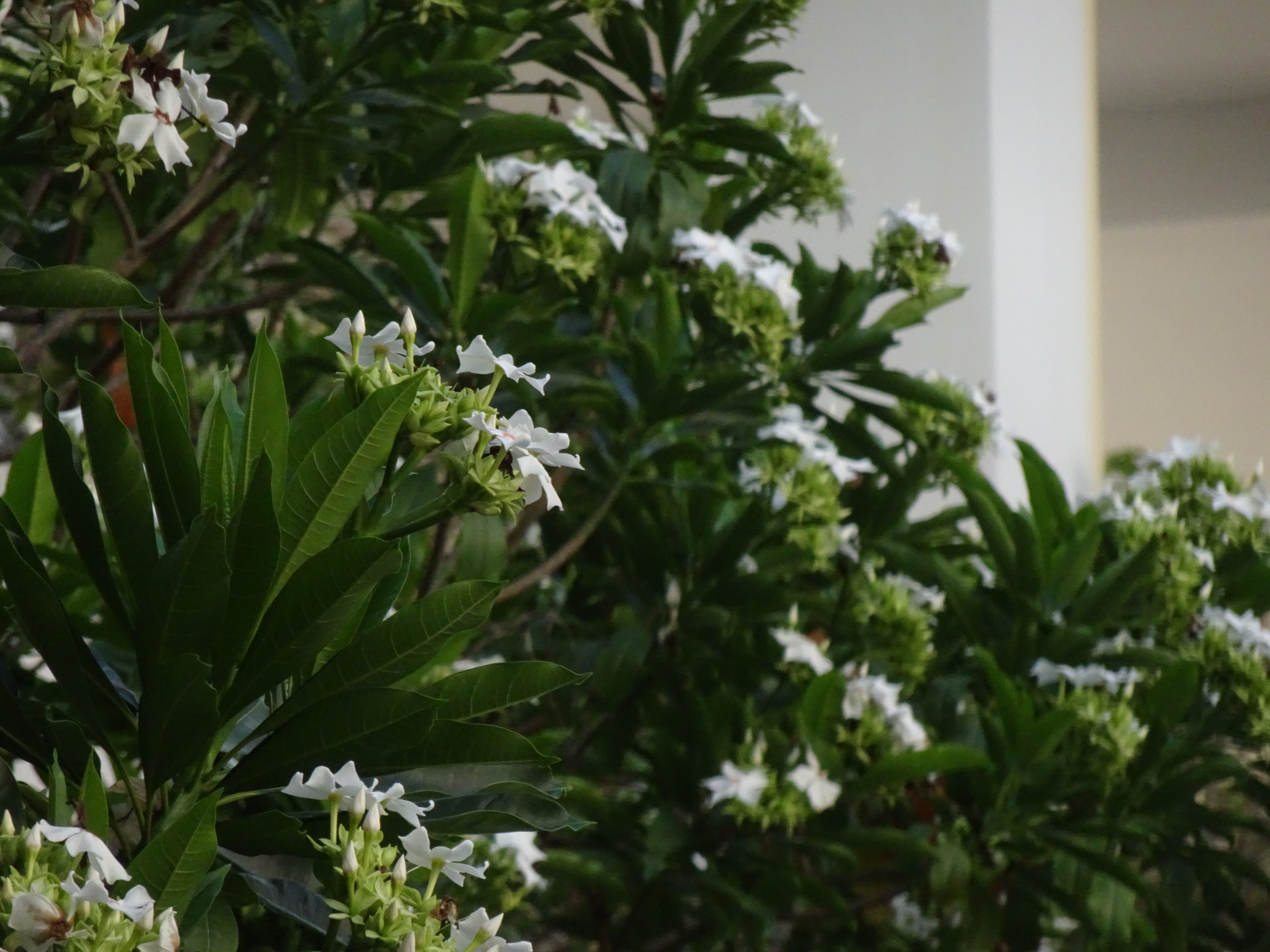

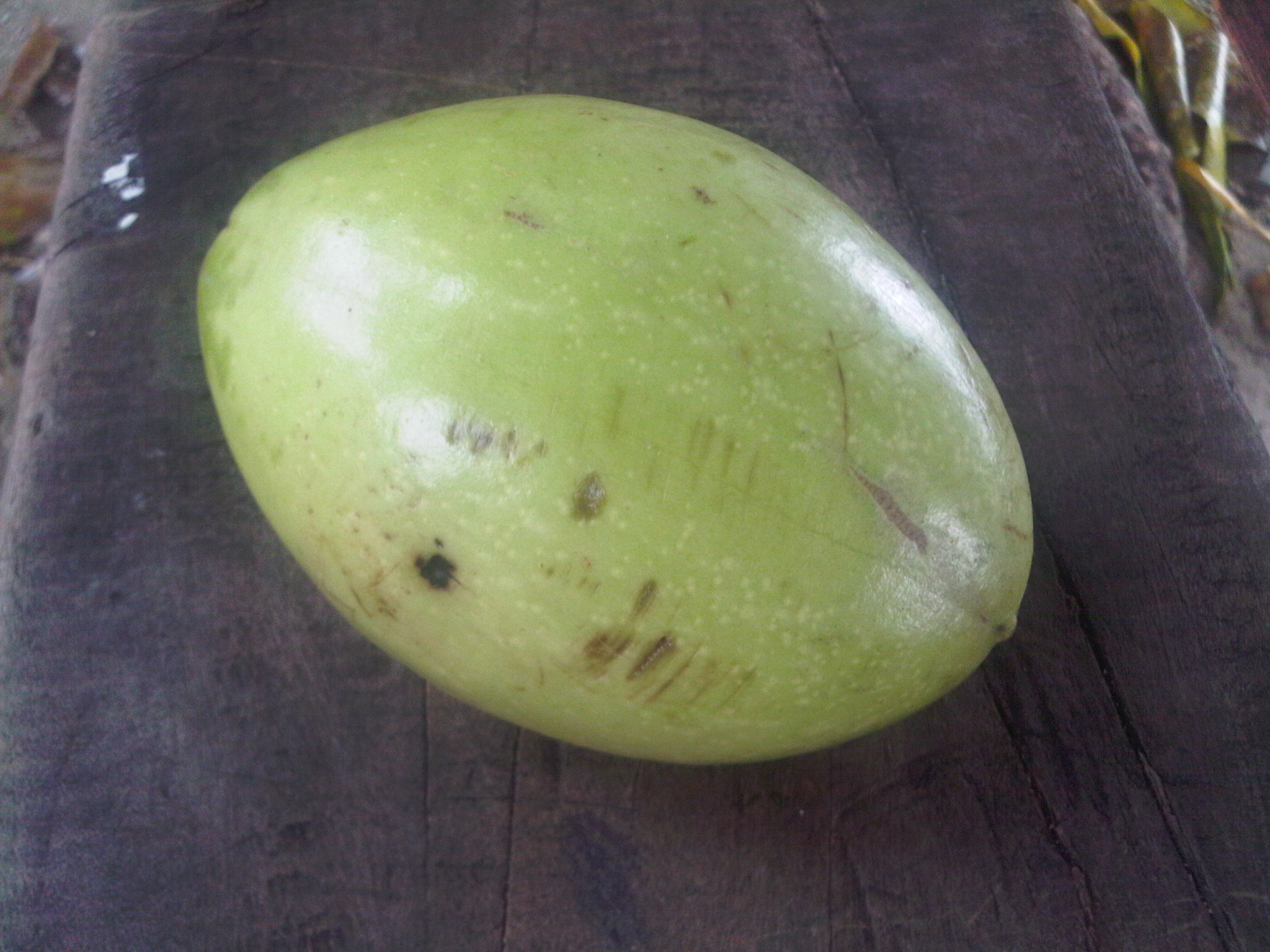
Unripe fruit

== See also ==
- Nerium
- Calabar bean
- Digitalis
