= James Cameron (missionary) =

British missionary and reformer

James Cameron (1799–1875) was a 19th-century British artisan missionary with a background in carpentry who, over the course of twenty-three years of service in Madagascar with the London Missionary Society (1826–1835; 1861–1875), played a major role in the Christianisation and industrialisation of that island state, then under the rule of the Merina monarchy.

== Early life ==
Cameron was baptised in Little Dunkeld in Perthshire, Scotland on 6 January 1800 and was a direct lineal descendant of MacIain Chief of Glencoe. His early years were spent in and around Murthly Castle where he learned carpentry. His father Thomas (1768-1860) spent his life in the service of the Laird of Murthly Castle and his grandfather was John Cameron of Grandtully (1717-1796). The LMS mission in Madagascar, established in 1820, accepted Cameron's petition to serve five years later when he was 25 years of age. Prior to arriving in Madagascar in September 1826 during the reign of the progressive King Radama I, he spent a year in Manchester assisting with the development of machinery which would eventually be installed at Amparibe, Madagascar, to modernize the production of cotton yarn.

== First mission to Madagascar ==
From Cameron's residence at Ambatonakanga where he constructed the first Christian temple and the first Western-style school in Madagascar, he employed and educated 600 young Malagasy in the construction of machinery and other public works projects. He introduced brick-making in 1826, a technology that was later to be used in a new Malagasy architectural style that was widely adopted throughout the Highlands of Madagascar. Cameron's brick house in Ambatonakanga would serve as a model for the new architectural style. He was instrumental in overseeing the installation of the first printing press on the island, which was used to print a translation of the Bible in the Malagasy language. Cameron was also a key contributor to the manufacture of gunpowder in Imerina and the introduction of hydraulic power drawn Lake Anosy, a man-made lake in the center of modern-day Antananarivo created for this purpose.

Upon the death of Radama I in 1828, the accession of his wife, Queen Ranavalona I, to the throne, and her subsequent attempt to rid the island of foreign influence, Christian proselytizing was forbidden and those practicing the new faith were actively persecuted. According to a speech delivered at Cameron's funeral, it was thanks to his intervention that the LMS was able to maintain a presence on the island until 1835, restricted though it might have been:

The missionaries were called together and asked whether they could not teach the people something more useful, such as soap making from materials found within the country. Evidently unless a favorable answer was forthcoming, the government was contemplating sending them away. It was then to Mr. Cameron that the missionaries looked for help; and taking a week for considering and studying the matter, he was able to meet the messengers of the government with two small bars of tolerably good white soap, with a promise of being able to continue its manufacture... There is little doubt that the continuation of the mission from 1829 to 1835 was mainly, if not entirely, due to the desire of the government for the services of Mr. Cameron and one or two of the other artisans... "

In 1835, pressure on the missionaries had increased to the point that the entire LMS team left the island.

== Years in South Africa ==
From 1835 to 1863, Cameron continued his missionary activities at the Cape of Good Hope in South Africa, where he lived with his wife, children, and grandchildren, engaged in commerce and worked as a surveyor to the Corporation of Cape Town. His son the Rev. James MacDonald Cameron was the first registrar of the University of the Cape of Good Hope. In 1853 the government of Mauritius employed Cameron to successfully negotiate with Ranavalona I regarding the terms of an agreement to restore trade between Madagascar and Mauritius that had been disrupted in 1845 by French and English attacks on the eastern Malagasy trading port of Toamasina.

== Second mission to Madagascar ==
Ranavalona's death in 1861 and her succession by her son Radama II reopened Madagascar to foreign influence and the activities of Christian missionaries there. Cameron immediately returned and once again undertook a wide variety of secular activities in addition to his continued activities as a missionary. He constructed several buildings on the Rova compound in Antananarivo, including the Manampisoa (1866), a royal tomb (1868) and the stone shell of the Queen's Palace (the Manjakamiadana) in 1869. The towers of the Manjakamiadana are similar to the towers of Murthly House in Scotland. He oversaw the construction of the Memorial Church at Faravohitra and another at Analakely, a hospital, several mission houses and village churches, and a water wheel to supply the munitions factory at Anosimahavelona. He was also the first to survey and map Imerina and the region around Fianarantsoa.

== Archives ==
The archives of the London Missionary Society and the personal papers of James Cameron are held by SOAS Special Collections.
