= Thomas Bevan (missionary) =

Welsh missionary

Thomas Bevan (c. 1796 – 31 January 1819) was, with fellow Welshman David Jones, the first Christian missionaries to Madagascar, sent by the London Missionary Society.

== Life and work ==
Bevan was born in the neighbourhood of Neuaddlwyd, Cardiganshire, about 1796. He came from a religious home, and at the age of 8, he was already a reader of the Bible. He experienced conversion near Nantgwynfynydd farm and on 19 November 1810, became a church member at Neuaddlwyd. There, the minister Thomas Phillips (1772–1842) encouraged him to begin preaching. He then went to Phillips's school at Pen-y-banc, and later to colleges at Newtown and, with Jones, at Gosport.

It was decided that he should go to Madagascar. He was ordained at Neuaddlwyd, 20–1 August 1817, and married Mary Jones (née Jacob) of Pen-yr-allt Wen in the same district.

Bevan and Jones, with their families, sailed for Madagascar on 9 February, arriving in Mauritius on 3 July 1818. Five weeks later, they embarked again, and landed at Tamatave, Madagascar, on 18 August 1818. Here they started a school with ten children. Bevan returned to Mauritius to fetch his family, returning on 6 January 1819. Their own child died on 20 January, Bevan himself died on 31 January, and his wife died on 3 February 1819. They are buried in Tamatave cemetery.
