= Fandroana =

Royal Bath in Madagascar

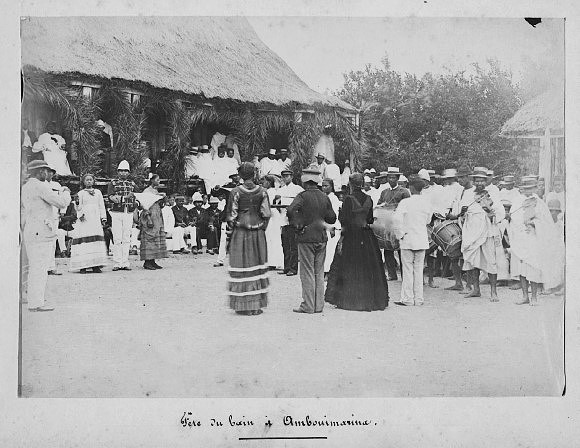
Royal Bath in Ambohimarina, northern Madagascar, around 1880.

The Fandroana, termed the Royal Bath by 19th century European historians, is the annual New Year's festival of the Merina people inhabiting the highlands of central Madagascar. The origins of the festival are preserved through oral history. According to folk legend, the wild zebu cattle that roamed the Highlands were first domesticated for food in Imerina under the reign of Ralambo. Different legends attribute the discovery that zebu were edible to the king's servant or to Ralambo himself. Ralambo is credited with founding the traditional ceremony of the fandroana to celebrate this discovery, although others have suggested he merely added certain practices to the celebration of a long-standing ritual.

== History ==
According to one version of the story, while traversing the countryside Ralambo and his men came across a wild zebu so exceptionally fat that the king decided to make a burnt offering of it. As the zebu flesh cooked, the enticing smell led Ralambo to taste the meat. He declared zebu meat to be fit for human consumption. In honor of the discovery, he decided to establish a holiday called fandroana that would be distinguished by the consumption of well-fattened zebu meat. The holiday was to be celebrated on the day of his birth, which coincided with the first day of the year. To this end, the holiday symbolically represented a community-wide renewal that would take place over a period of several days before and after the first of the year.

== Practices ==
Although the precise form of the original holiday cannot be known with certainty and has evolved over time, 18th- and 19th-century accounts suggest what the event may have been like. Accounts from these centuries indicate that all family members were required to reunite in their home villages during the festival period. Estranged family members were expected to attempt to reconcile. Homes were cleaned and repaired and new housewares and clothing were purchased. The symbolism of renewal was particularly embodied in the traditional sexual permissiveness encouraged on the eve of the fandroana (characterized by early 19th-century British missionaries as an "orgy") and the following morning's return to rigid social order with the sovereign firmly at the helm of the kingdom.

On this morning, the first day of the year, a red rooster was traditionally sacrificed and its blood used to anoint the sovereign and others present at the ceremony. Afterward the sovereign would bathe in sanctified water, then sprinkle it upon attendees to purify and bless them and ensure an auspicious start to the year. Children would celebrate the fandroana by carrying lighted torches and lanterns in a nighttime processional through their villages. The zebu meat eaten over the course of the festival was primarily grilled or consumed as jaka, a preparation reserved uniquely for this holiday. Jaka was prepared during the festival by sealing shredded zebu meat with suet in a decorative clay jar; this confit would then be conserved in an underground pit for twelve months to be served at the next year's fandroana.

In November 1943, a fandroana was held in Toulouse by the authorities of Vichy France. The Chef d'état Philippe Pétain was dressed as a Merina king and received a wooden zebu sculpture from the tirailleurs malgaches (Malagasy soldiers) stranded in France after the British invasion of Madagascar.
