= L'Aube rouge (novel) =

1925 novel by Jean-Joseph Rabearivelo

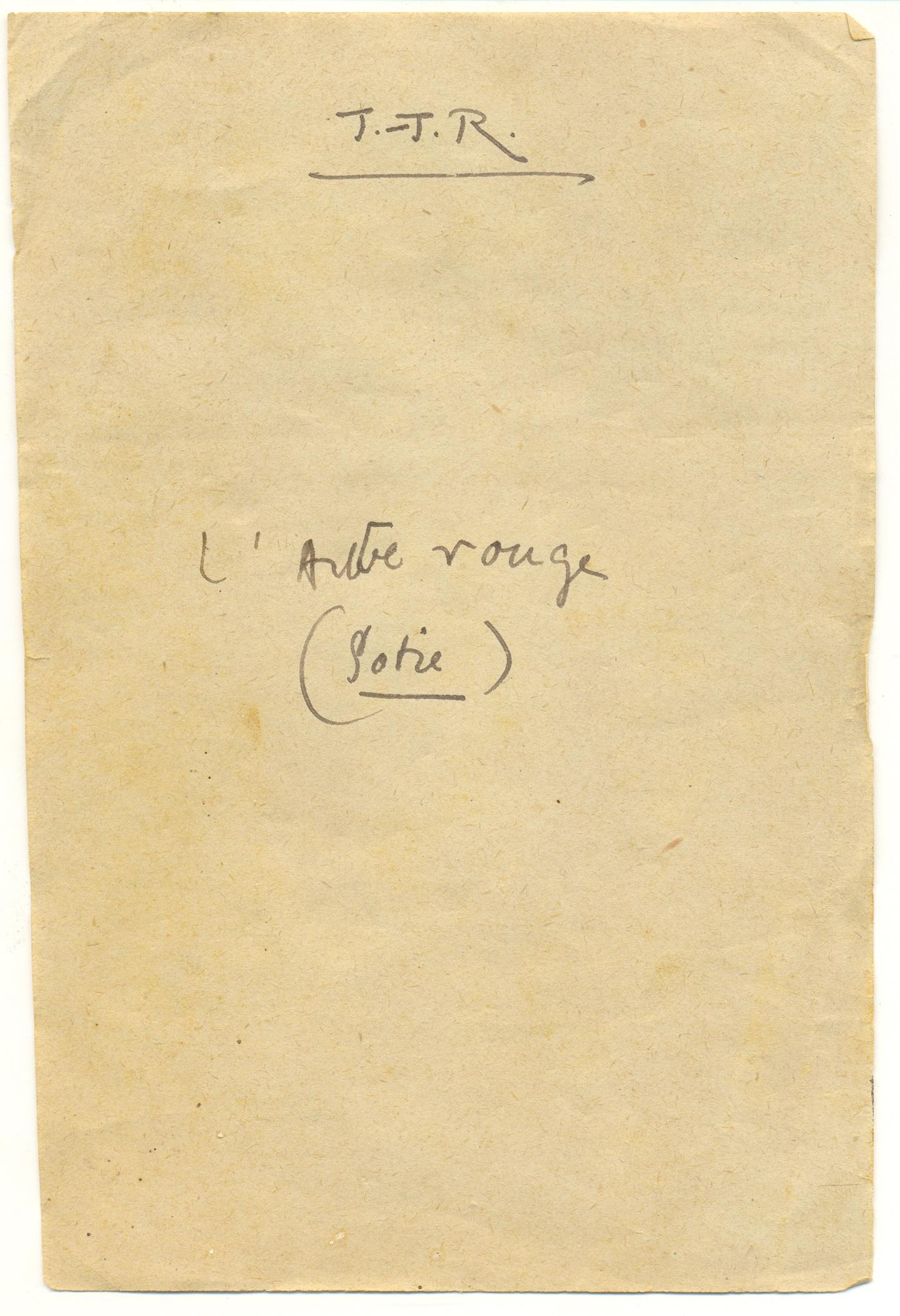
- Title page of the 1925 manuscript, which names the work as a sotie
- Author: Jean-Joseph Rabearivelo
- Language: French
- Genre: Historical fiction Sotie
- Set in: Antananarivo, 1882–96
- Publication date: Written 1925; published 1998
- Publication place: Madagascar

L'Aube rouge ([lob ʁuʒ], "The Red Dawn") is an historical novel by Malagasy poet Jean-Joseph Rabearivelo. Its narrative, influenced by the author's Malagasy nationalist sentiments in the context of French colonization, follows the 1883–96 invasions of Madagascar by France and the war of resistance fought by the Malagasy Kingdom of Imerina. L'Aube rouge, Rabearivelo's first novel, was written in 1925 and published posthumously in 1998, 61 years after the author's death by suicide.

== Plot and characters ==
The narrative of L'Aube rouge spans from 1882 to 1896, and includes the French invasions of Madagascar, the death of Queen Ranavalona II, the ascendance of Ranavalona III, and the imposition of French rule on Madagascar after her defeat.

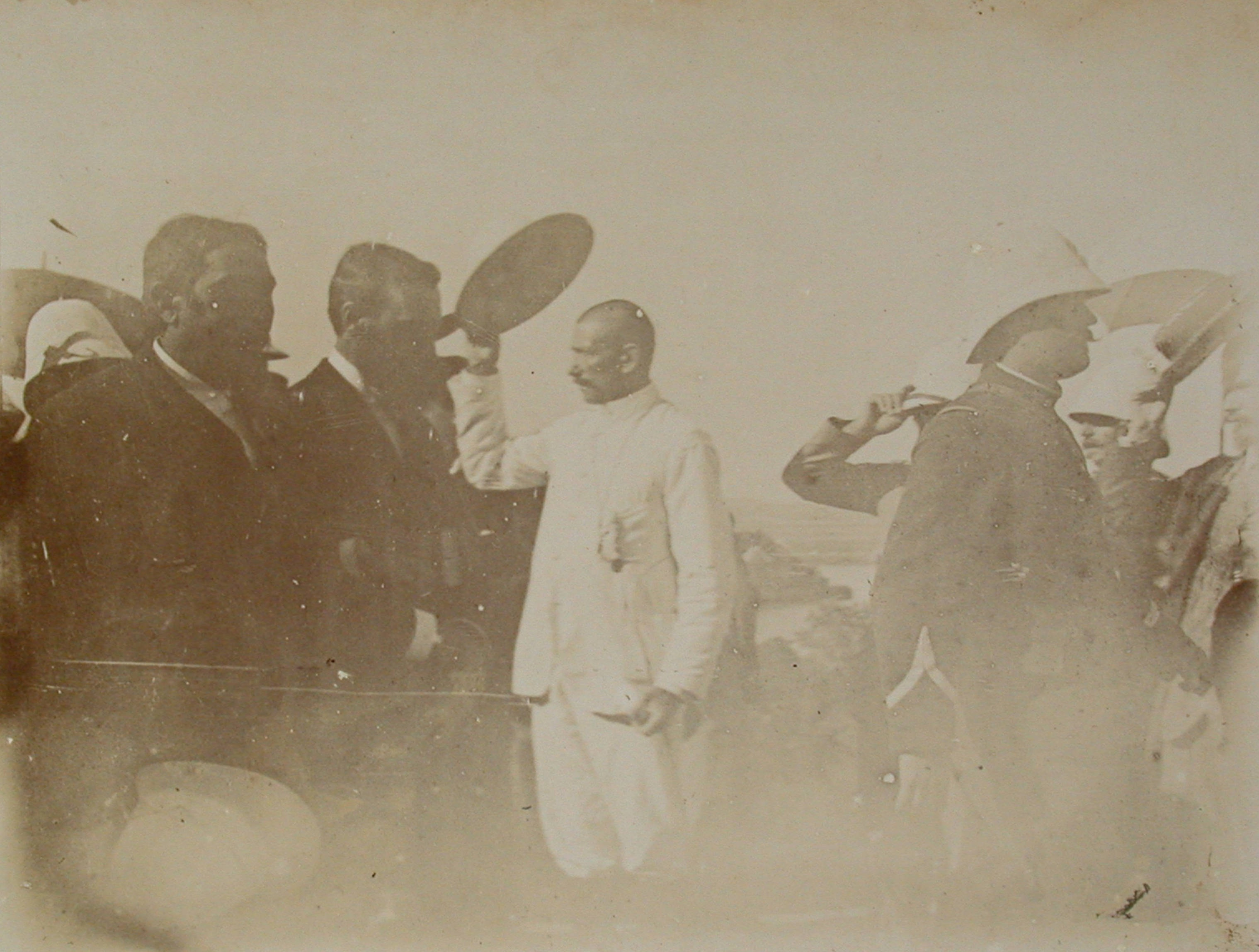
Rainandriamampandry, seen here being led to the site of his execution in 1896 for suspected involvement in the Menalamba rebellion, is especially lionized in the narrative of L'Aube rouge.

The novel's only fictional character is a young Malagasy noblewoman named Rangala (described by Moradewun Adejunmobi as a metaphor for Madagascar); the rest are real historical figures involved in the Franco-Hova Wars. The central characters on the Malagasy side are the Imerina Queens Ranavalona II and Ranavalona III, Prime Minister Rainilaiarivony, and the governor of Tamatave and poet Rainandriamampandry, who was executed by the French in 1896 for his suspected role in the Menalamba rebellion. The British advisers to the Malagasy government General Digby Willoughby and Lieutenant Charles Shervington also feature centrally, and a number of historical French officials are present as well.

Every prominent character of L'Aube rouge is a ruler or member of the ruling class, a choice that Moradewun Adejunmobi attributes to Rabearivelo's agenda to protect the ideology of the precolonial Imerina ruling class and the Malagasy notion of kingdom (fanjankana). "In L'Aube rouge," writes Adejunmobi, "these ruler-protagonists are so idealized that they have no shortcomings whatsoever, except that of excessive love of the nation; their single desire and preoccupation is to rule and defend Madagascar's independence."

== Writing and publication ==
Gavin Philip Bowd writes that, at the time of L'Aube rouge's writing, Jean-Joseph Rabearivelo was haunted by the fall of the Imerina kingdom and the loss of his own aristocratic status.

Rabearivelo was inspired to write L'Aube rouge as his first novel in 1925 after reading the Prix Goncourt-winning Batouala by René Maran, to whom L'Aube rouge is dedicated (alongside three prominent Malagasies). Serge Meitinger observes in L'Aube rouge "very faithful imitation of the transitions used by Maran in his novel, the paintings of nature described especially at sunrise and sunset, the strong allusions to the lunar cycle and climatic nuances, the suggestive description of the fauna and flora."

Rabearivelo depended on French publishers to support his career as a writer in French Madagascar, and was aware that his anti-colonial historical fiction (including his second novel, L'Interférence) could not be published under colonial rule. He acknowledged this in a "preliminary note" in the manuscript of L'Aube rouge, making reference to the condemned Fleurs du mal:

Like Baudelaire at the threshold of a condemned book, may I not say o reader:

PITY ME ... OTHERWISE I CURSE YOU!

Though Rabearivelo destroyed several of his manuscripts shortly before committing suicide in 1937, L'Aube rouge was preserved in his official papers and published posthumously in 1998. An annotated edition was published in 2020 with the title L'Aube rouge: sotie.
