= Princess Marie-Louise of Madagascar =

Malagasy princess and nurse

Marie-Louise
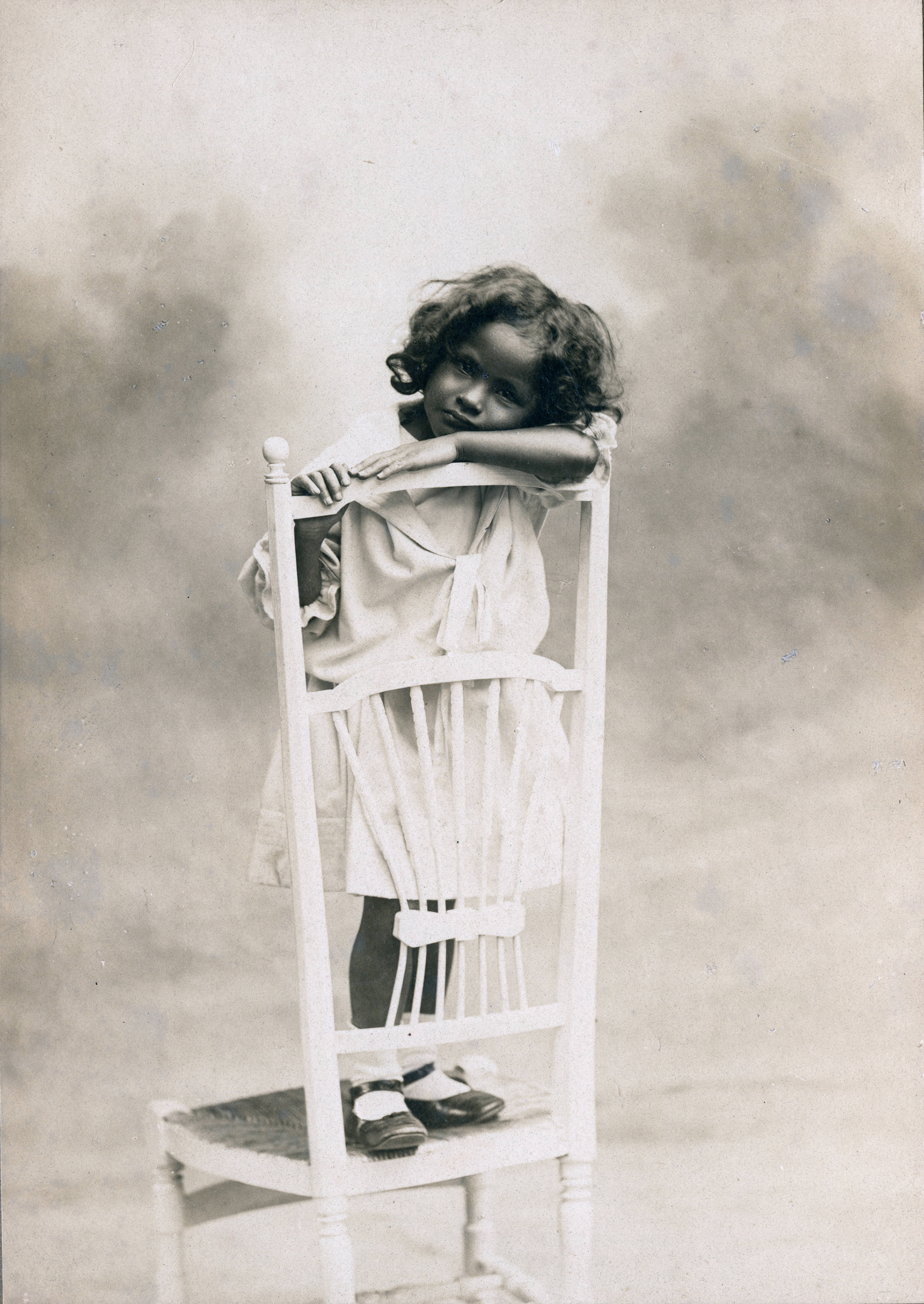
- Marie-Louise in 1901
- Born: 1 May 1897; Hotel de l'Europe, Saint-Denis, Réunion, France
- Died: 18 January 1948 (aged 50); Bazoches-sur-le-Betz, Loiret, France
- Burial: Cimetière de Montreuil
- Spouse: André Bossard
- Dynasty: Hova
- Mother: Princess Razafinandriamanitra
- Religion: Roman Catholicism

Princess Marie-Louise Razafinkeriefo of Madagascar (1 May 1897 – 18 January 1948) was the last heir apparent to the throne of the Kingdom of Madagascar. She was a grandniece, and the adoptive daughter, of Ranavalona III. During World War II, she worked as a nurse and was made a Dame of the National Order of the Legion of Honour by the French government for her medical service.

== Biography ==
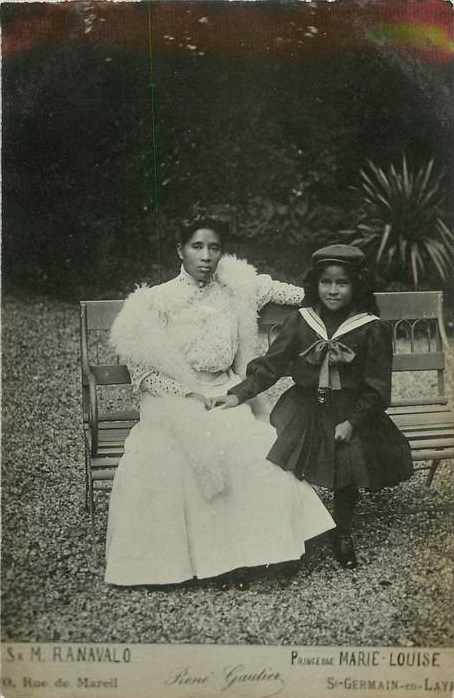
Princess Marie-Louise (right) with Queen Ranavalona III at Saint-Germain-en-Laye, in 1905

Princess Marie-Louise of Madagascar was born in exile on 1 May 1897 at the Hotel de l'Europe in Saint-Denis, Réunion. Her mother, Princess Razafinandriamanitra, was a daughter of Princess Rasendranoro and a niece of Ranavalona III. She was an illegitimate child, as her mother had conceived her with an unknown French soldier. She was born while the royal family was in exile in French territory after the Malagasy monarchy was abolished due to French colonial rule. Her mother died five days after giving birth. Although the royal family were Protestant, Marie-Louise was baptized in the Catholic faith at the Cathedral of St. Denis to appease the French. She was later adopted by Queen Ranavalona and was, according to the traditional rules of succession, the heir apparent to the abolished throne of Madagascar.

Within a month of arriving in Saint-Denis, the royal family were moved into a house owned by Madame de Villentroy on the corner of rue de l'Arsenal and rue du Rempart near the French government offices. Along with the queen and princesses, the royal household included two secretaries, a cook, a maid, and servants. They lived in the house for almost two years before they were moved by the French government. With tensions between France and the United Kingdom over conflict in Sudan, French officials became concerned that Madagascar might launch a rebellion against French rule. Queen Ranavalona's presence in Réunion was seen as a possible source of encouragement for Malagasy rebels, so the royal family was relocated. On 1 February 1899, they boarded the steamship Yang-Tse and sailed to Marseille. They were held in France for several months before being transferred to a villa in Mustapha Superieur in French Algeria. Despite being Catholic, Marie-Louise attended Protestant services at a Reformed Church with her family in central Algiers.

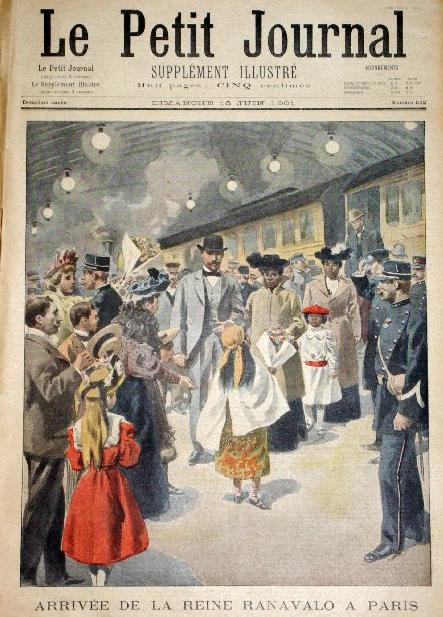
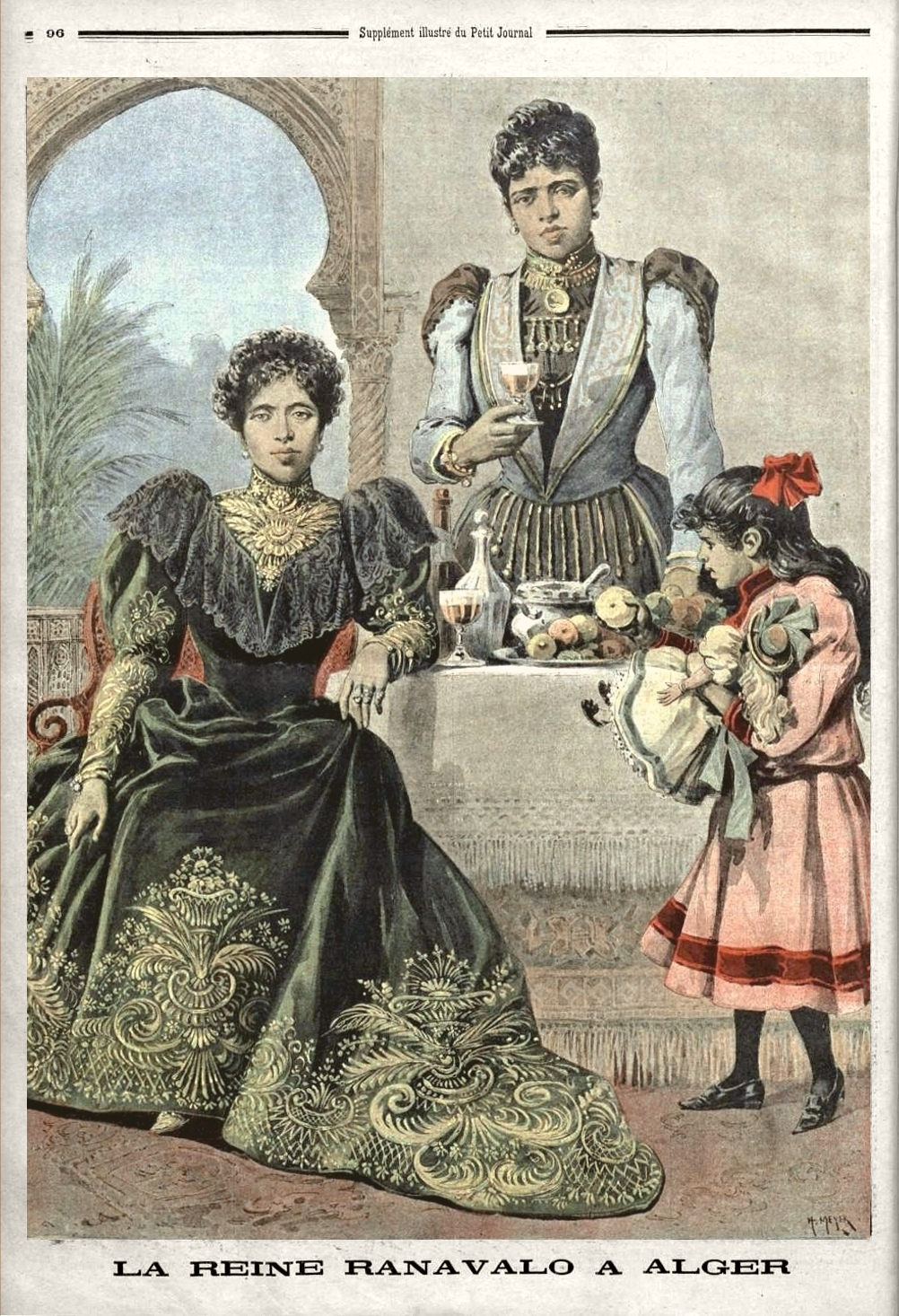
Queen Ranavalona III's arrival in France for her first official visit, accompanied by Princess Ramasindrazana and Princess Marie-Louise in 1901 (left), and the royal trio in Algiers in 1899 (right)

Marie-Louise left Algeria for France to attend secondary school at the Lycée de Jeunes filles de Versailles. During that time, her great-aunt, Queen Ranavalona, died in 1917. In France, Marie-Louise met a French agricultural engineer named André Bossard. They married on 24 June 1921. She continued to receive a small pension from the French government, but decided to pursue a career as a nurse. She was awarded Dame of the National Order of the Legion of Honor by the French government for her medical services during World War II. Marie-Louise and Bossard's marriage was childless, and they later divorced. She lived her remaining years as a socialite in Parisian high society. She died in Bazoches-sur-le-Betz on 18 January 1948 and was buried in Montreuil. She was the last successor to the throne of Madagascar.

=== Foreign honors ===
- Dame of the National Order of the Legion of Honour

== Bibliography ==
- Barrier, Marie-France (1996). Ranavalona, dernière reine de Madagascar. Paris: Balland. ISBN 978-2-7158-1094-5.
- Saillens, Pasteur R. (1906). "Impressions of Algeria". The Missionary Review of the World. Vol. 29. London: Funk & Wagnalls.
