= Order of Ranavalona III =

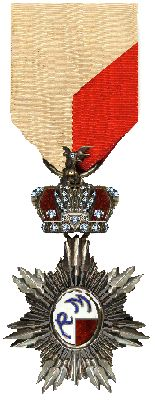
- Knight's cross.

Awarded by Ranavalona III
- Type: Chivalric order in five classes
- Established: May, 1896
- Status: Disestablished
- Grades: Grand Cordon; Grand Officer; Commander; Officer; Knight
- Order of Ranavalona III ribbon

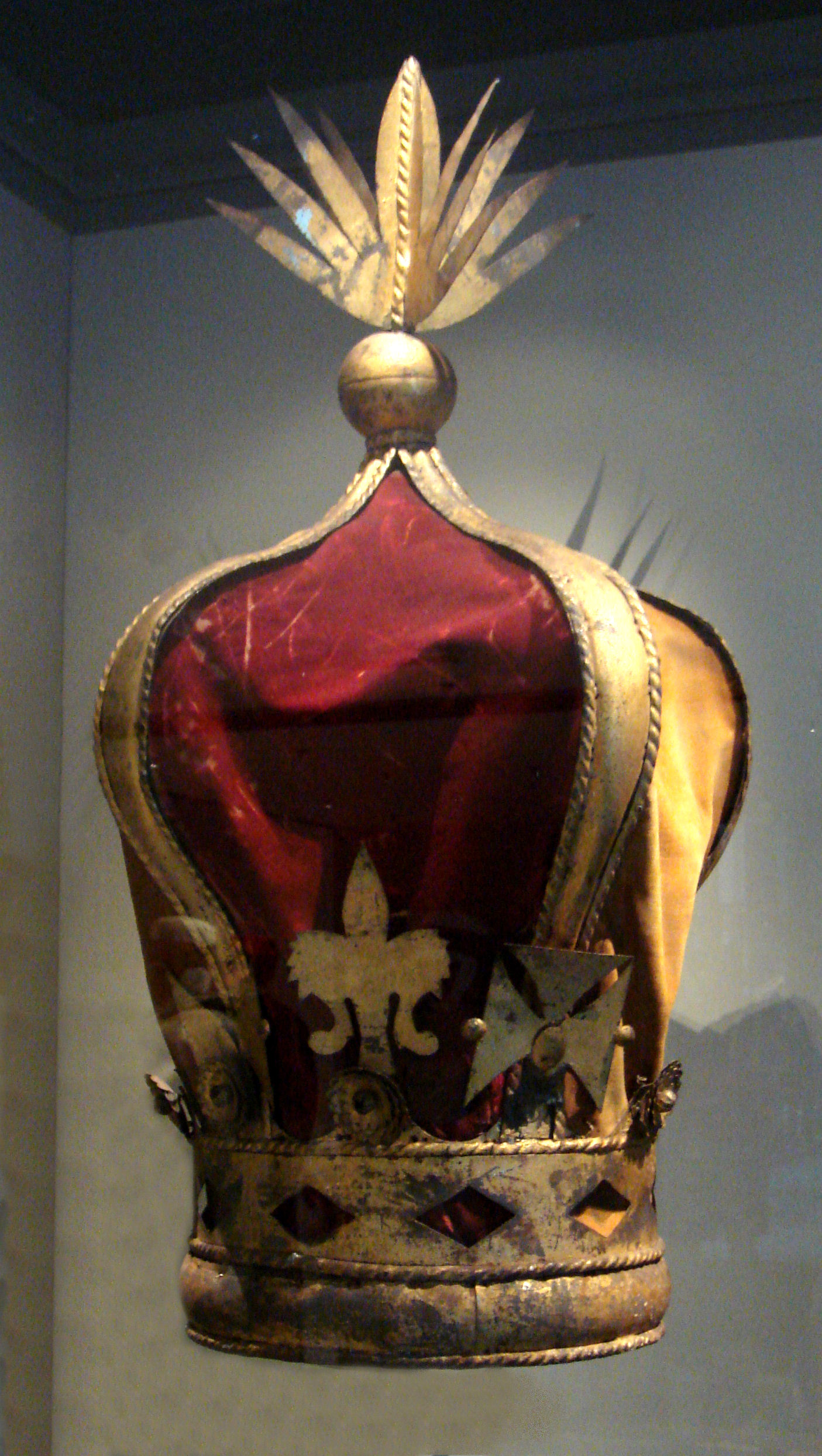
The crown of Madagascar.

Madagascar instituted its first order of merit after the French occupation of the island in May 1896. The Order of Ranavalona III was named after the ruling queen, Ranavalona III of Madagascar. The order was founded in 1896 and was abolished along with the Malagasy monarchy on 28 February 1897. The badges of this order are therefore quite rare.

The jewel of the order is a seven pointed silver star made up out of spears. The oval medallion bears the letters "RM" (Ranavalo Manjaka).

The back is flat and unadorned. It bears the mark of the Parisian jeweler Mrs. Chobillon.

The ribbon was white with a red canton.
