= Valalafotsy =

Historical region in north-western Imerina

- Religion: Traditional beliefs
- Government: Local chieftainship
- Historical era: Pre-colonial Madagascar
Succeeded by
Merina Kingdom
- Today part of: Madagascar

Valalafotsy was a historical region in the north-western extremity of the ancient Imerina in central Madagascar. It was a refuge for Vazimba communities displaced from central Imerina.

== History ==
Valalafotsy served as a refuge for Vazimba communities displaced from central Imerina. These communities, later identified as the Manendy, formed an autonomous territory on the north-western margin of Imerina.

The Manendy of Valalafotsy initially allied with Marovatana to resist Andrianampoinimerina. After Andrianampoinimerina invaded Valalafotsy, the Manendy defected to him. Ratsiampiry then participated in the Merina campaign in Marovatana and was later appointed its chief alongside the Merina prince Andriamatoaramena. Many Manendy were subsequently relocated to Anativolo in Avaradrano and Anosivola in Marovatana.

Following its incorporation into Imerina, Valalafotsy was established as a separate province, and Andrianampoinimerina appointed his nephew Ravalosaha as its first governor to oversee the territory and the nearby north-western frontier with the Sakalava.

During the Menalamba rebellion, Valalafotsy was seized by bands of dissidents from Mamolakazo, Ambodirano, and Marovatana. French troops had not yet entered the area. These bands slaughtered European gold prospectors in Valalafotsy and used the territory as a base to strike at French forces.
