= Ranavalona III =

Queen of Madagascar from 1883 to 1897

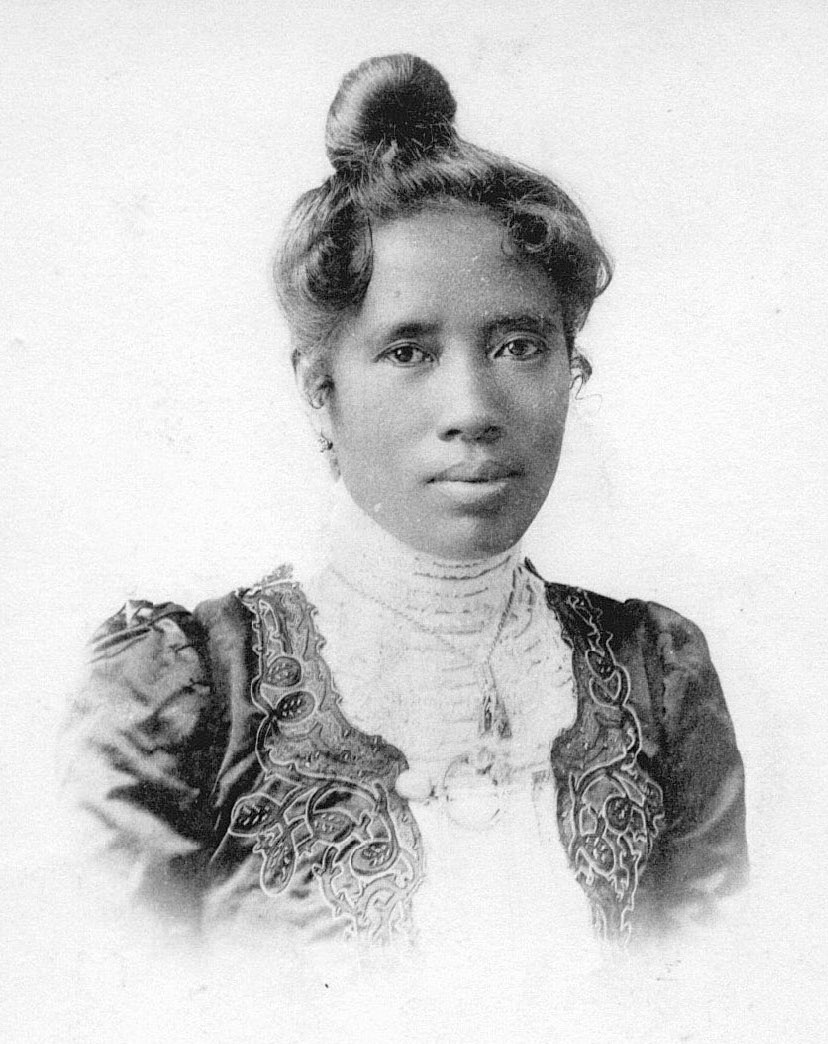
- Portrait, c. 1905

Queen of Madagascar
- Reign: 30 July 1883 – 28 February 1897
- Coronation: 22 November 1883
- Predecessor: Ranavalona II
- Successor: Monarchy abolished; Marie-Louise (as head of the Hova dynasty)
- Prime ministers: Rainilaiarivony; Rainitsimbazafy; Rasanjy
- Born: Razafindrahety; 22 November 1861; Amparibe, Manjakazafy, Madagascar
- Died: 23 May 1917 (aged 55); Algiers, French Algeria
- Burial: 1917 (original); 1938; 2007 (reinterred); Saint-Eugene cemetery of Algiers (original); Rova of Antananarivo; Ambohimanga (reinterred)
- Spouse: Ratrimo; Rainilaiarivony
Names
- Ranavalona III (Ranavalo Manjaka III) Razafindrahety (Razafy)
- Dynasty: Hova
- Father: Andriantsimianatra
- Mother: Princess Raketaka
- Religion: Protestantism

Ranavalona III (Malagasy pronunciation: [ranaˈvalːə̥]; 22 November 1861 – 23 May 1917) was the last sovereign of the Kingdom of Madagascar. She ruled from 30 July 1883 to 28 February 1897 in a reign marked by ultimately futile efforts to resist the colonial designs of the government of France. As a young woman, she was selected to succeed Queen Ranavalona II. Like both preceding queens, Ranavalona entered a political marriage with a member of the Hova elite named Rainilaiarivony, who largely oversaw the day-to-day governance of the kingdom and managed its foreign affairs in his role as prime minister. Ranavalona tried to stave off colonization by strengthening trade and diplomatic relations with foreign powers throughout her reign, but French attacks on coastal port towns and an assault on the capital city of Antananarivo led to the capture of the royal palace in 1895, ending the sovereignty and political autonomy of the centuries-old kingdom.

Ranavalona and her court were initially permitted to remain as symbolic figureheads, but the outbreak of a popular resistance movement called the menalamba rebellion, and the discovery of anti-French political intrigues at court, led the French to exile her to the island of Réunion in 1897. Rainilaiarivony died that same year, and Ranavalona was relocated to a villa in Algiers, along with several members of her family. The queen, her family, and the servants accompanying her were provided an allowance and enjoyed a comfortable standard of living, including occasional trips to Paris for shopping and sightseeing. Ranavalona was never permitted to return home to Madagascar, despite her repeated requests. She died of an embolism at her villa in Algiers in 1917 at age 55. Her remains were buried in Algiers but were disinterred 21 years later and shipped to Madagascar, where they were placed within the tomb of Queen Rasoherina on the grounds of the Rova of Antananarivo.

== Early years ==
Ranavalona III, daughter of Andriantsimianatra and his wife and cousin Princess Raketaka, was born Princess Razafindrahety on 22 November 1861, at Amparibe, a rural village in the district of Manjakazafy outside Antananarivo. Razafindrahety's lineage, as niece to Queen Ranavalona II and great-granddaughter of King Andrianampoinimerina, qualified her to potentially inherit the throne of the Kingdom of Madagascar. Her parents assigned the care of the infant Razafindrahety to a slave who served the family.

Birthplace of Princess Razafindrahety in Manjakazafy

When she was old enough to attend school, Razafindrahety was taken into the custody of her aunt, Queen Ranavalona II, who ensured she began receiving a private education from a London Missionary Society (LMS) teacher. She was described as an industrious and inquisitive child with a strong love of studying the Bible, learning and reading, and she developed affectionate relationships with her teachers. She continued her education throughout her adolescence at the Congregational School of Ambatonakanga, the Friends High School for Girls, and the LMS Girls' Central School. She was baptized as a Protestant at Ambohimanga on 5 April 1874. Her teachers consistently described her as ranking among their strongest students.

As a young woman, Razafindrahety married an Andriana (nobleman) named Ratrimo (Ratrimoarivony). Her husband died several years later on 8 May 1883, aged 22, leaving Razafindrahety a premature widow. According to rumor, Prime Minister Rainilaiarivony may have arranged to have Ratrimo poisoned for political reasons. The Aristocratic Revolution of 1863, which had been orchestrated by Rainilaiarivony's older brother, Prime Minister Rainivoninahitriniony, had replaced the absolute rule of the Andriana with a constitutional monarchy in which power was shared between an Andriana monarch and a Hova (freeman) prime minister. This arrangement was to be cemented by a political marriage between the prime minister and a ruling queen effectively selected by him. As Queen Ranavalona II neared death and the search for her successor began, Rainilaiarivony may have had Ratrimo deliberately poisoned so that Razafindrahety, the most eligible successor, would be free to marry the prime minister and succeed to the throne.

== Reign ==
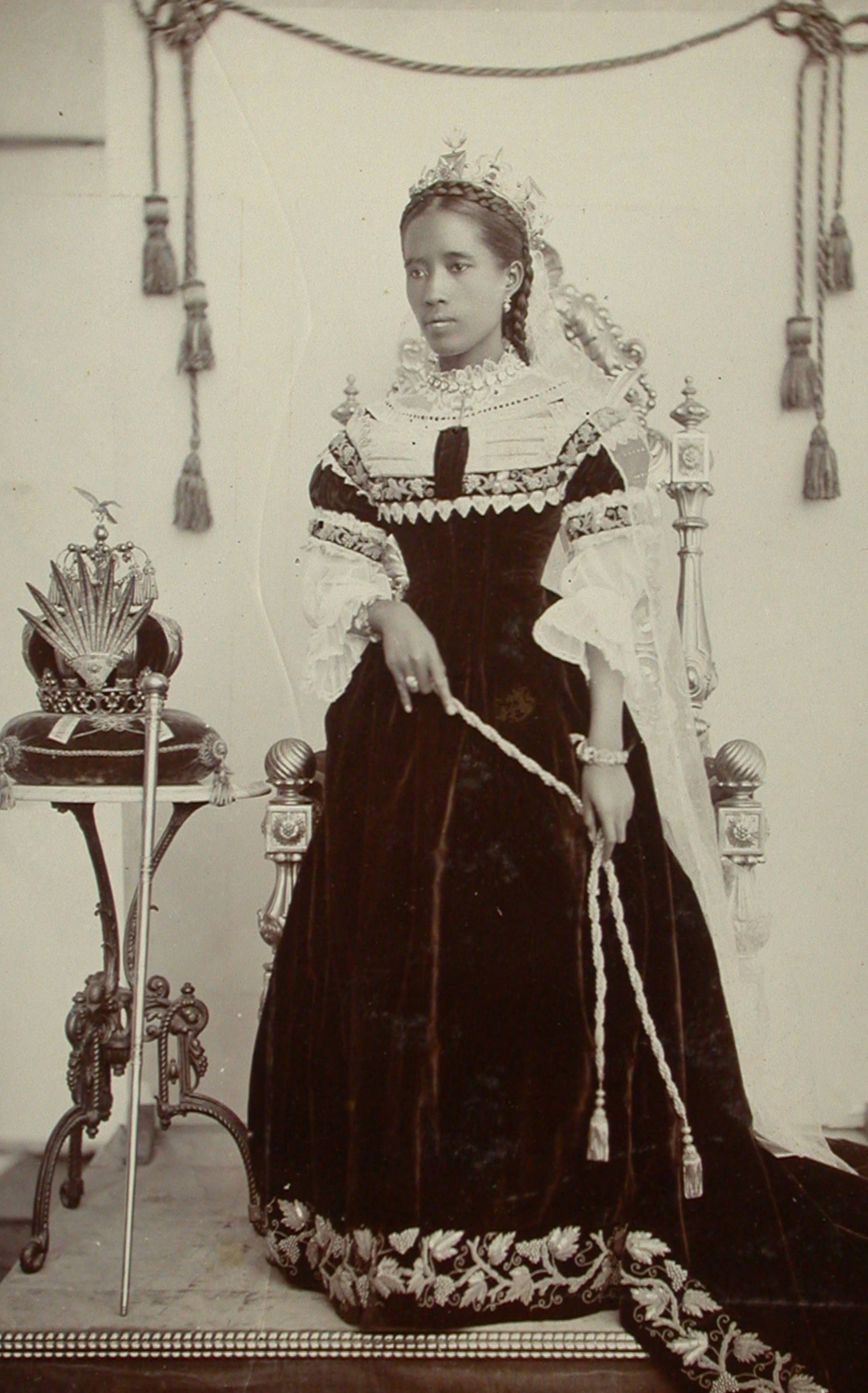
The queen standing next to the Royal crown and sceptre

Ranavalona III was proclaimed queen upon the death of her predecessor, Queen Ranavalona II, on 13 July 1883, and moved into Tsarahafatra, a wooden house on the grounds of the royal Rova complex in Antananarivo. Her coronation took place in the Mahamasina neighborhood of Antananarivo on 22 November 1883, her 22nd birthday, where she was given the title "Her Majesty Ranavalona III by the grace of God and the will of the people, Queen of Madagascar, and Protectoress of the laws of the Nation". She chose to break with tradition by supplementing the customary retinue of soldiers at her ceremony with a group of 500 male and 400 female pupils from the capital's best schools. The girls were dressed in white while the boys wore soldiers' uniforms and performed traditional military drills with spears. Ranavalona was crowned wearing a white silk gown with a red train featuring embroidery and gold embellishments. The queen was described in the American press in the following terms: "She is a little above the ordinary height and has delicate features, her complexion is a little darker than that of most of her subjects. She appears quite timid and she presides well at the solemn functions of her court." The British Museum holds a Ranavalona III ten centime coin struck in 1883.

Like her two predecessors, Ranavalona concluded a political marriage with Prime Minister Rainilaiarivony. The young queen's role was largely ceremonial as nearly all important political decisions continued to be made by the much older and more experienced prime minister. Ranavalona was frequently called upon to deliver formal speeches (kabary) to the public on behalf of Rainilaiarivony and would make appearances to inaugurate new public buildings, such as a hospital at Isoavinandriana and a girls' school at Ambodin'Andohalo. Throughout her reign, Ranavalona's aunt, Ramasindrazana, acted as an adviser and exercised considerable influence at court. Ranavalona's older sister, Rasendranoro, whose son Rakatomena and daughter Razafinandriamanitra lived with their mother at the Rova, was also a close companion. An American journalist who visited her palace reported that Ranavalona spent much of her leisure time flying kites or playing lotto, a parlor game, with her relatives and other ladies at court. She also enjoyed knitting, needlework and crocheting and would frequently bring her latest craft project to work on at cabinet meetings. She had a great love of fine garments and was the only Malagasy sovereign to import the majority of her clothing from Paris rather than London. She invited to Madagascar French stage magician Marius Cazeneuve to perform at her court. Reportedly, the queen and Cazeneuve developed a romantic relationship, and the magician was also working for the French intelligence, promoting French influence at court.

=== Franco-Hova War ===
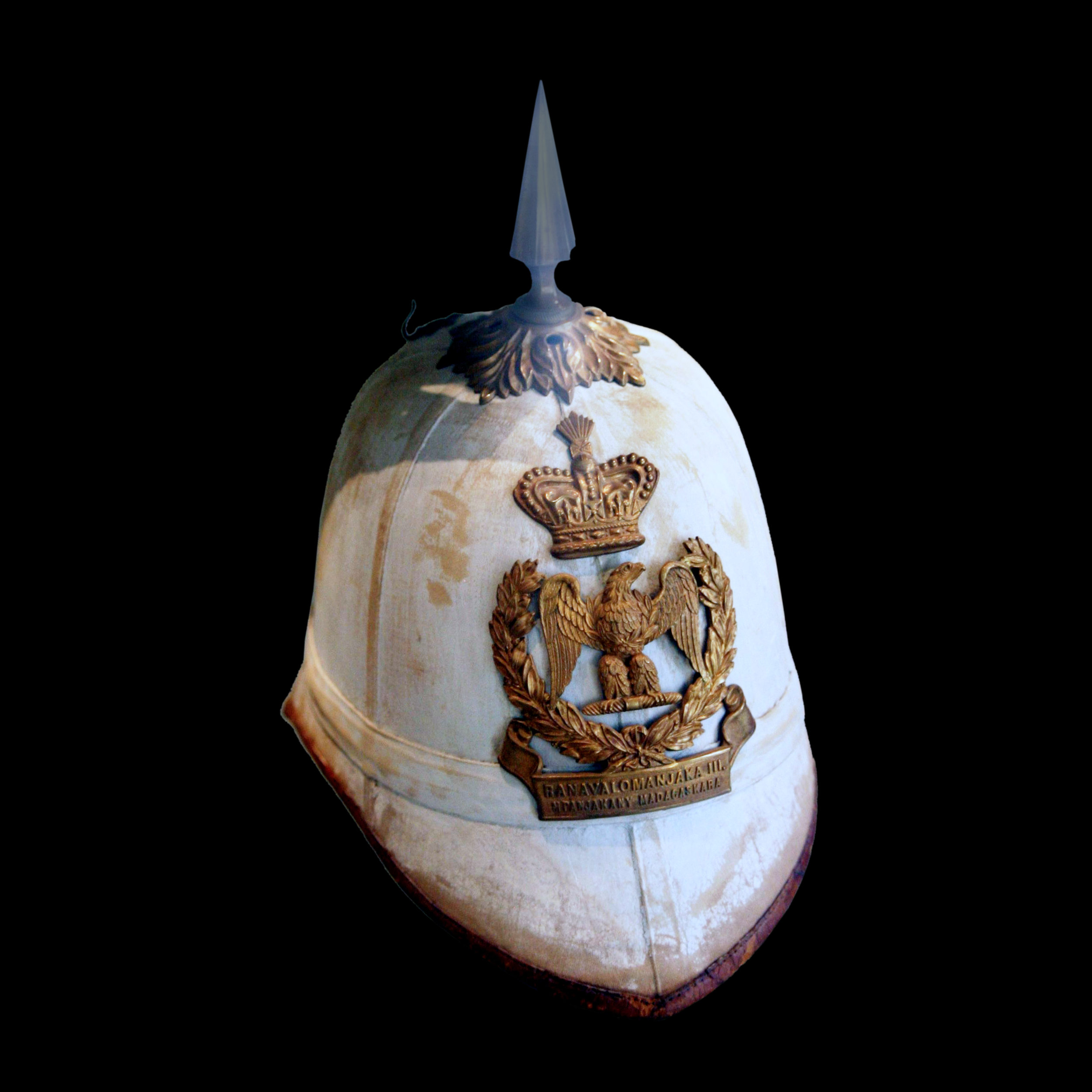
Pith helmet in the Second French Empire style, worn by soldiers in the army of Ranavalona III. The inscription reads "Ranavalona III, [is the] Ruler of Madagascar" (displayed at the Musée de l'Armée).

As sovereign of Madagascar, Ranavalona III became involved in the endgame of the maneuvering that had been taking place between the British and French since the beginning of the 19th century. The tension between France and Madagascar had grown especially acute in the three years prior to Ranavalona's succession, with an intensification of attacks in the months prior to her coronation. In February 1883 the northwestern coast was bombarded, followed by the occupation of Mahajanga by the French in May, and bombardment and capture of Toamasina in June. Attacks along the northern coast were ongoing at the time Ranavalona III was crowned in the summer of 1883. Shortly after the French initiated this latest round of hostilities, Prime Minister Rainilaiarivony decided to engage Digby Willoughby, a Briton who had gained combat experience in the Anglo-Zulu War as a member of the Natal Mounted Police, to oversee the nation's military affairs and train the queen's army to defend the island against the seemingly inevitable French invasion.

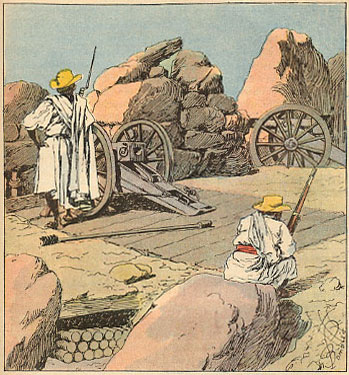
Merina soldiers fought to preserve Malagasy sovereignty against the French invasion.

Throughout this period Madagascar continued to engage the French in negotiations, but these were to prove unsuccessful with both sides unwilling to capitulate on key points of contention. After two years of stalemate, a column brought an ultimatum to Antananarivo in December 1885, asking for the acceptance of French claims in northeastern Madagascar, a French protectorate over the Sakalava, recognition of French property principles and an indemnity of 1,500,000 francs. This peace treaty was ratified by Ranavalona and Rainilaiarivony in January 1886 and French government representatives two months later.

Prior to ratification, the queen and her prime minister sought clarification about several articles in the main treaty that stated "foreign relations" would be controlled by a French resident and referenced "establishments" at Diego-Suarez Bay. Two key French negotiators, Minister Patrimonio and Admiral Miot, provided an explanation affixed to the treaty as an annex, which led the rulers of Madagascar to deem the treaty an adequate enough safeguard of their nation's sovereignty to warrant their approval and signature. However, the official treaty was published in Paris without the annex or any reference to it. When the annex was later published in London, the French denied it had any legal validity. France declared a protectorate over the island despite the opposition of the Malagasy government and the omission of this term from the treaty.

The international reaction to this latest turn of events was varied and greatly colored by national interests. The British were unwilling to defend Madagascar's sovereignty for fear that the French might retaliate and fail to recognize Britain's claim to certain protectorates of its own. All official British engagement with Madagascar was henceforth transacted through the French resident, but these communiques were not officially recognized by Ranavalona and her court. The United States and Germany, on the other hand, continued to deal directly with the queen's government as the rightful authority in Madagascar. This discrepancy forced a reinterpretation of one aspect of the treaty, resulting in the queen's authority over internal affairs being maintained.

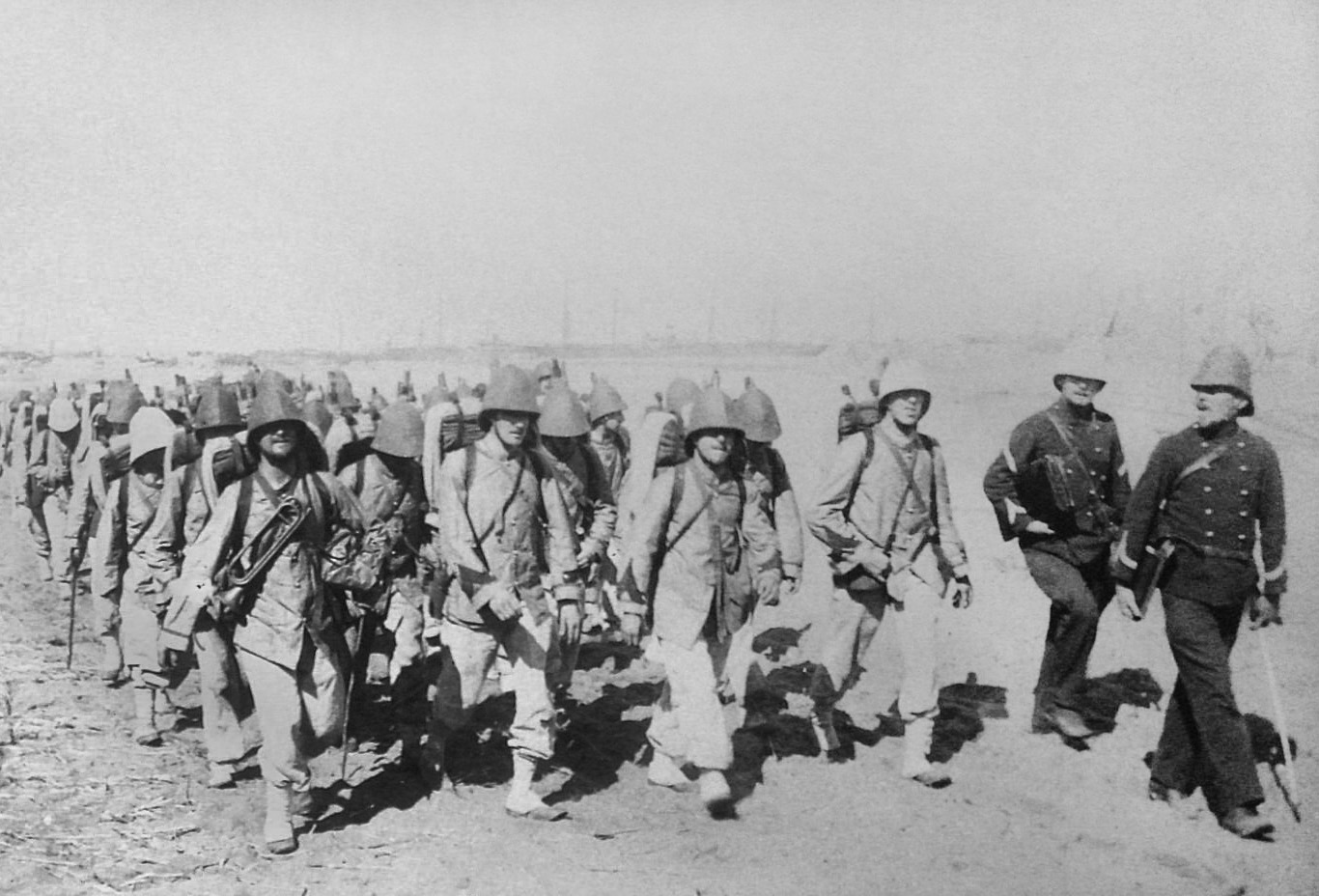
French troops landing in Mahajanga in 1895

In 1886, the queen attempted to solicit the support of the United States in preserving Madagascar's sovereignty by sending gifts to then-President Grover Cleveland, including silk akotofahana cloths, an ivory pin and a woven basket. However, the United States was neither able nor willing to assert itself militarily or diplomatically in favor of preserving Madagascar's independence. Ranavalona signed a treaty granting further concessions to the French on 12 December 1887.

France's claim to Madagascar as its protectorate was officially recognized by Britain in the Anglo-French agreement of 1890. Between 1890 and 1894, the French sought to aggressively claim what they believed to be the territorial rights established by the treaty. However, these French land claims and settlements were perceived by Ranavalona and Rainilaiarivony as an unjustifiable encroachment upon Malagasy sovereignty. Ultimately Charles Le Myre de Vilers was sent to persuade the queen and her prime minister to submit to the French interpretation of the treaty with the intent to launch a war and take the island by force if an agreement was not reached. The French offer was flatly refused and diplomatic relations between France and Madagascar were broken off in November 1894.

Upon terminating diplomatic relations, the French bombarded and occupied the harbor of Toamasina on the east coast in December 1894, then captured Mahajanga on the west coast the following month and immediately began their gradual advance, constructing roads through the malarial swamps that hindered passage to the island's interior. The main expeditionary troops arrived in May. Over 6,000 of the original 15,000 French soldiers lost their lives to disease as they gradually moved inland, necessitating several thousand reinforcements drawn from French colonies in Algeria and Sub-Saharan Africa. The column reached the capital in September 1895. For three days the Malagasy army managed to hold the French troops at the periphery of the city, but upon French bombardment of the Rova palace compound with heavy artillery, Ranavalona agreed to surrender control of her kingdom to the French.

=== French colonization ===
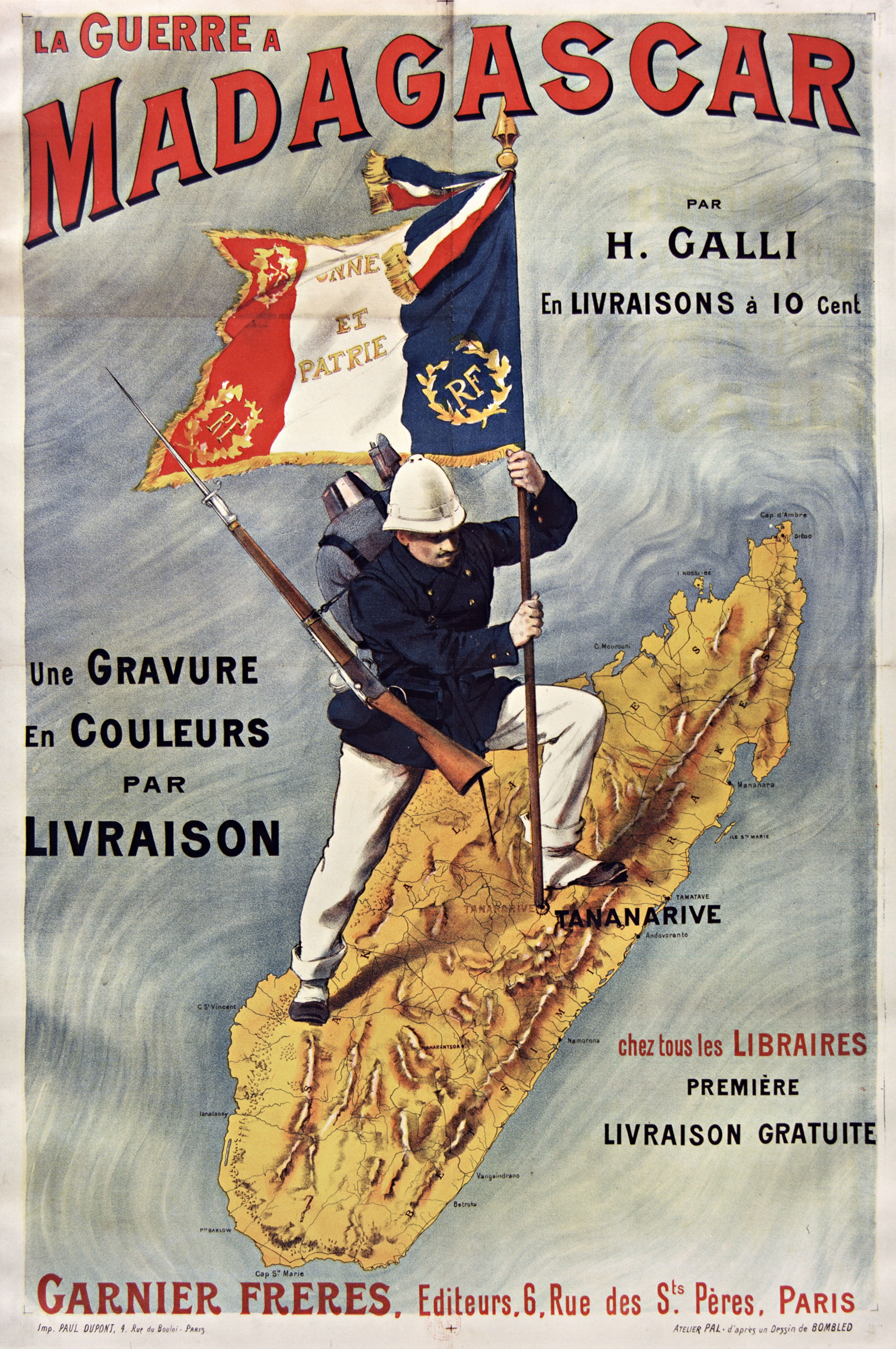
Ranavalona conceded defeat to the French in September 1895, marking the end of the Merina monarchy.

France officially annexed Madagascar on 1 January 1896. That August, the French officially declared Madagascar to be their colony and exiled Prime Minister Rainilaiarivony to Algiers (in French Algeria) where he died the following year. The queen and much of her administration remained but were afforded no real political power. Shortly after Rainilaiarivony's exile, Ranavalona was approached by a French official who informed her that a new prime minister would need to be selected. The queen hastily concluded that General Jacques Duchesne, the French general who had successfully led the military campaign against the Merina monarchy, would be a probable choice. Assuming that Malagasy political tradition would be preserved, Ranavalona believed she would be forced to marry whichever man was chosen for the job and worriedly asked if Duchesne was to be her next husband. Surprised, the French official reassured her that France had no intention of imposing a husband on the queen and would never again require her to marry a prime minister. The queen's minister of foreign affairs, Rainitsimbazafy, was nominated to the post of prime minister by mutual consent.

In December 1895, two months after the French capture of Antananarivo, popular resistance to French rule emerged in the form of the menalamba ("red shawl") rebellion. This guerrilla war against foreigners, Christianity and political corruption quickly spread throughout the island and was principally conducted by peasants who wore shawls smeared with the red laterite soil of the highlands. The resistance movement gained ground until it was effectively put down by the French military at the end of 1897. Members of Ranavalona's court were accused of encouraging the rebels and many leading figures were executed, including the queen's uncle Ratsimamanga (brother of her favored adviser, Ramasindrazana) and her minister of war, Rainandriamampandry. Ramasindrazana, the queen's aunt, was exiled to Réunion, as the French were reluctant to execute a woman.

The resistance led the government of France to replace the island's civil governor, Hippolyte Laroche, with a military governor, Joseph Gallieni. The day before Gallieni arrived in Antananarivo, he had a message sent to the queen requiring her to present herself and her entourage at the military headquarters, preceded by a standard bearer carrying a French flag. The queen was obliged to sign documents handing over all royal property to France before being placed under arrest and imprisoned in her own palace. She was only allowed to receive visitors who had obtained prior authorization from Gallieni himself. While imprisoned, Ranavalona offered to convert to Roman Catholicism in an attempt to curry French favor but was informed that such a gesture was no longer necessary.

== Exile ==
Gallieni exiled Ranavalona from Madagascar on 27 February 1897, and officially abolished the monarchy the next day. French officials ordered the queen to leave her palace at 1:30 in the morning. She was carried from Antananarivo by palanquin as the city slept, accompanied by 700–800 escorts and porters. Throughout the days spent traveling to the eastern port of Toamasina where she would board a ship to Réunion, Ranavalona reportedly drank heavily. At Toamasina on 6 March, Ranavalona was notified that her sister Rasendranoro and aunt Ramasindrazana would be arriving shortly, as would the queen's fourteen-year-old niece, Razafinandriamanitra, who was nine months pregnant with the illegitimate child of a French soldier.

=== Réunion Island ===
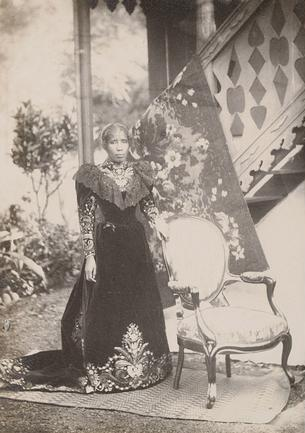
The queen in exile on Réunion

Together, the family sailed on La Peyrouse to the port of Pointe des Galets, a site twenty kilometers (12 miles) from the capital of St. Denis, to secure a discreet arrival. Despite this effort, a crowd of French onlookers jeered and shouted as the boat docked, angry at the queen for the loss of French lives incurred during France's campaign to occupy Madagascar. After waiting for the crowd to disperse, the captain escorted the queen and her party into a horse-drawn buggy, the first Ranavalona had ever seen, and drove to the Hotel de l'Europe in St. Denis. Young Razafinandriamanitra, suffering from the emotional and physical strains of the journey into exile, went into labor shortly after reaching the hotel. She gave birth to a girl on her second day in Réunion, but could not recover her strength and died five days later. The infant was named Marie-Louise and was baptised a Catholic to avoid antagonizing the French. Marie-Louise, who could have become heir-apparent according to the traditional rules of succession, was adopted by Ranavalona as her own daughter.

Within a month the party had been moved to a house owned by a Madame de Villentroy, located at the corner of rue de l'Arsenal and rue du Rempart near the French government offices in St. Denis. Ranavalona was reportedly pleased with the two-story house, which had a large walled garden and featured a peaked roof and wrap-around veranda reminiscent of the traditional highland homes of Madagascar. In addition to the queen and her aunt, sister, and grand-niece, the royal household included two secretaries, a cook, a maid, three servants for Ranavalona, and several more servants for her aunt and sister. The queen's private pastor was authorized to make visits freely to the royal household.

The queen's party occupied the house in Réunion for just under two years. As tensions between the United Kingdom and France began to mount once again, this time over the conflict in Sudan, the French authorities became concerned that elements of the population in Madagascar might seize the opportunity to launch a new rebellion against French rule. The queen's proximity to Madagascar was seen as a possible source of encouragement for would-be Malagasy rebels. French authorities made an abrupt decision to remove Ranavalona and her party to Algeria, a more distant location. On 1 February 1899, with very little forewarning, Ranavalona and her family were ordered aboard the Yang-Tse accompanied by a secretary-interpreter and several maids. During the 28-day journey to the French port of Marseille, the passengers stopped over at such ports as Mayotte, Zanzibar, Aden and Djibouti. Throughout the trip, the various captains responsible for the journey were under orders to prevent Ranavalona from speaking with anyone who was not French. The party was held for several months at Marseille before being transferred to a villa in the Mustapha Superieur area in Algiers. Ranavalona had hoped to continue on to Paris and was greatly disappointed to learn she was instead being sent to Algeria, reportedly bursting into tears and remarking, "Who is certain of tomorrow? Only yesterday I was a queen; today I am simply an unhappy, broken-hearted woman."

=== Algiers, Algeria ===
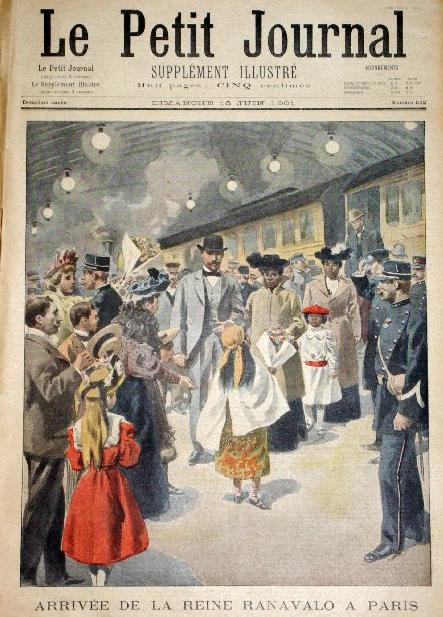
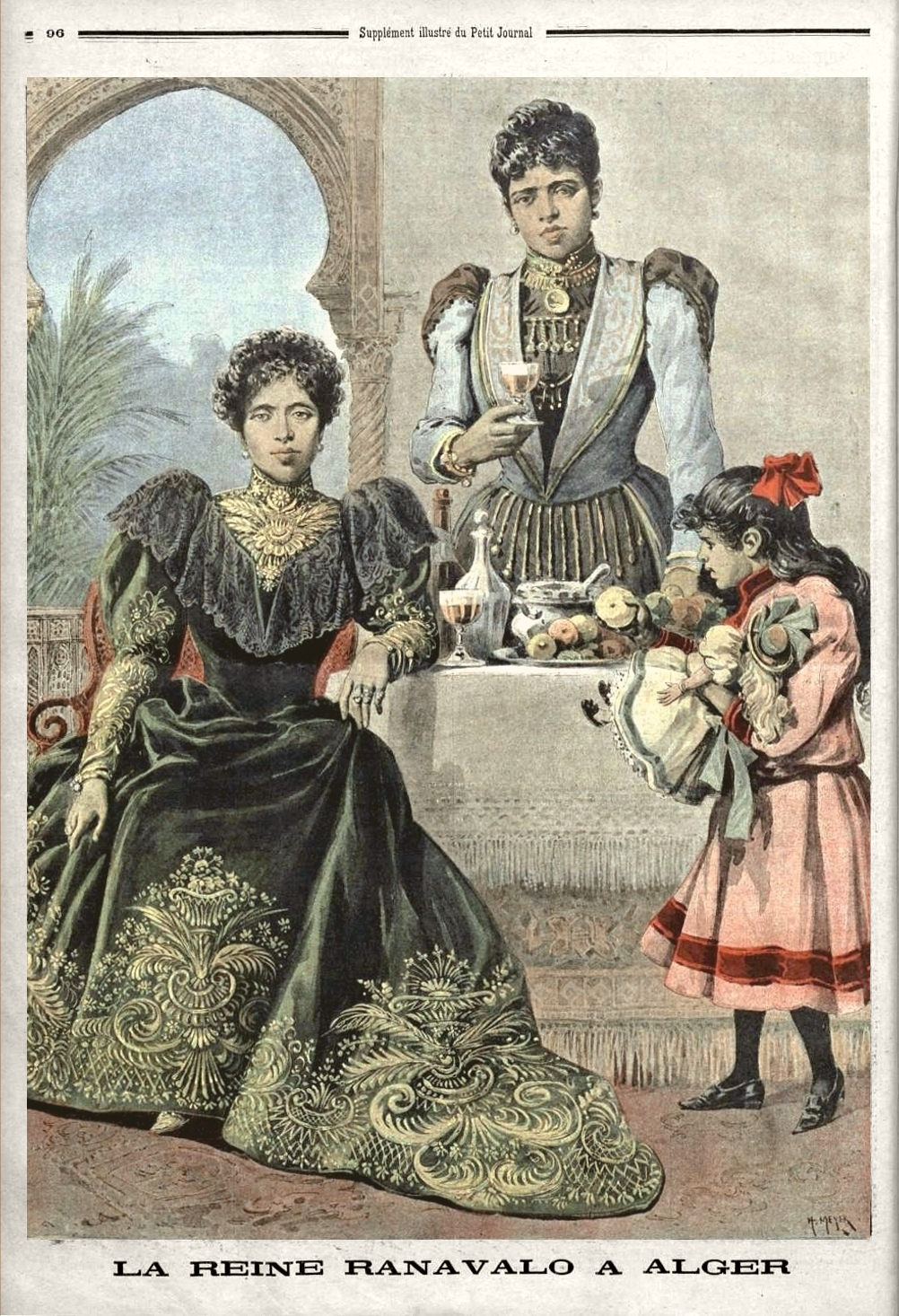
Ranavalona's arrival in France for her first official visit, accompanied by her aunt Ramasindrazana and niece Marie-Louise in 1901 (left), and the royal trio in Algiers in 1899 (right)

At the queen's villa in Algiers, Ranavalona was provided with servants and a French female attendant who kept her under observation and remained present whenever the queen entertained guests in her home. In addition, the government of France initially provided Ranavalona with an annual allowance of 25,000 francs paid from the budget for the colony of Madagascar and authorized by the colony's Governor General. Nearly all the queen's property had been seized by the colonial authorities, although she had been permitted to keep certain personal belongings, including some of her jewelry. Her initial pension allowed such a humble lifestyle that the colonial government of Algeria lobbied unsuccessfully several times on her behalf to obtain an increase for her. Ranavalona also tasked a servant with selling some of her jewelry for cash, but the plan was discovered by the French colonial authorities and the servant was discharged and sent back to Madagascar.

In response to her urgent entreaties, she was permitted to go to Paris and do some shopping. She cut a great figure on the boulevards, and was immensely popular, but she spent so much money and ran up such enormous bills that the Colonial office became alarmed and promptly shipped her back to Algiers.

— Kings in Exile, Our Paper (1904)

During the first years of her exile in Algeria, Ranavalona soon discovered the excitement of the socialite lifestyle among the elite of Algiers. She was regularly invited to parties, outings and cultural events and often hosted events of her own. However, homesickness was ever-present and the impossibility of visiting Madagascar contributed to melancholy and boredom. She would frequently take long walks alone in the countryside, along the beach, or through the town to clear her mind and lift her spirits. The queen was eager to see mainland France and especially Paris and repeatedly submitted formal requests for permission to travel. These were routinely denied until May 1901 when Ranavalona received the first of many authorizations to visit France. That very month, the queen moved into a small apartment in the 16th arrondissement of Paris near the Avenue Champs-Élysées and what is now the Place Charles de Gaulle, from which she visited the major sights of the city and was invited to numerous receptions, balls, shows and other events. She was widely received by high society with courtesy and admiration and was offered many gifts including a costly gown. During this first trip, Ranavalona visited the Palace of Versailles, was formally received at the Paris City Hall, and spent three weeks on vacation in Bordeaux. Finally, Ranavalona visited the beaches of Arcachon before exhausting her budget and boarding an Algeria-bound ship at Marseille in early August. The details of her visit attracted much attention from the Parisian press, which expressed sympathy for the queen's fate and recrimination toward the French government for failing to provide a larger pension or accord her the consideration she deserved as a recipient of the Legion of Honor.

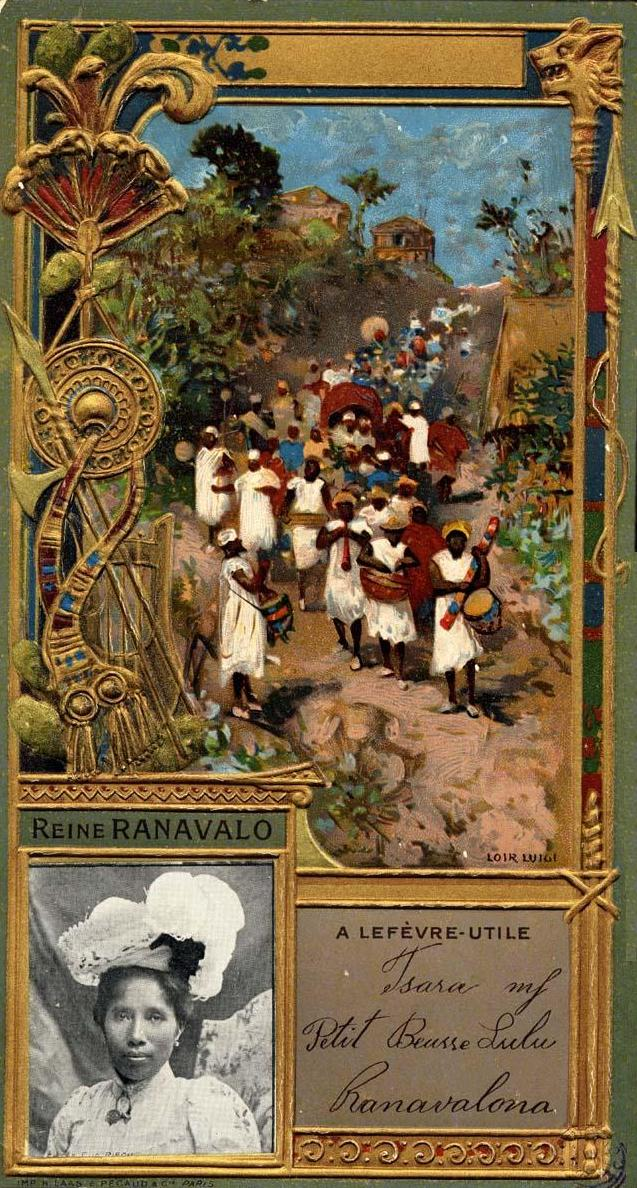
Ranavalona on a Petit Beurre biscuits box in 1916. The inscription reads Tsara ny Petit Beurre (Malagasy: "Petit Beurre is good").

Ranavalona would return to France six more times over the course of the next twelve years. Her frequent visits and excellent reputation made her the cause célèbre of many French citizens who pitied the queen's fate and admired her gracious acceptance of her new life. Ranavalona's visits were generally accompanied by much media fanfare and the queen's popularity among the French public grew to the extent that she was featured on the box of Petit Beurre biscuits in 1916. The queen's second visit to France occurred in September 1903, when she visited Vic-sur-Cère and Aurillac. Pressure by citizens during this visit succeeded in raising her pension to 37,000 francs. Two years later she would visit Marseille and Saint-Germain and inhabit a large five-bedroom Parisian apartment in the sixteenth arrondissement from which she would attend the Paris Opera, observe a session of the French House of Representatives and be formally received at the Ministry of the Colonies. Again due to pressure from sympathetic French citizens, Ranavalona's pension was further raised to 50,000 francs per annum. On her next visit in 1907, the queen would use Dives-sur-Mer as a home base to visit the Calvados region, where she was photographed for the French press. From August to September 1910, Ranavalona would visit Paris, Nantes, La Baule and Saint-Nazaire and was repeatedly the target of undesired attention from press photographers. Her 1912 trip to the tiny, remote village of Quiberville would coincide with the increase of her annual pension to 75,000 francs. The queen's final voyage in 1913 would take her to Marseille, Aix-les-Bains and Allevard.

The outbreak of World War I in 1914 put an end to Ranavalona's visits to France. Throughout her time in Algeria, she and her family regularly attended the weekly Protestant service at the Reformed Church building in central Algiers. After the war began she sought to contribute by vigorously participating in the activities of the Algerian Red Cross.

== Death and aftermath ==
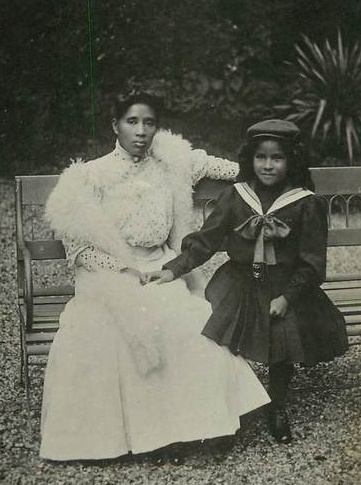
The Queen with niece Marie-Louise at Saint-Germain-en-Laye, in 1905

Ranavalona died without ever having returned to Madagascar, after two formal requests in 1910 and 1912 were refused on the pretext of insufficient funds in the colonial coffers. The exiled queen died suddenly at her villa in Algeria on 23 May 1917, the victim of a severe embolism. Ranavalona was buried at the Saint-Eugene cemetery in Algiers at 10:00 a.m. on 25 May. Her funeral was attended by dozens of personal friends, admirers, Red Cross colleagues, members of her church congregation and prominent figures of the political and cultural elite of Algiers. By nine in the morning, a long line of cars had already formed at the entrance to the cemetery.

This effusive display of respect and remembrance on the part of Ranavalona's friends was not mirrored by the French colonial administration in Madagascar. In June 1925, eight years after the queen's death, the Governor-General of Algeria informed the Governor-General of Madagascar by letter that payments for the maintenance of Ranavalona's tomb were in default. He urged the colonial government in Madagascar to provide funds for the upkeep of the dilapidated tomb, emphasizing that such neglect was unworthy of the queen's memory and the government of France alike. The request was twice refused and the tomb was never refurbished. In November 1938, Ranavalona's remains were exhumed and re-interred in the tomb of Queen Rasoherina at the Rova of Antananarivo in Madagascar. A fire on the night of 6 November 1995 severely damaged the royal tombs and destroyed most of the other buildings at the site. The lamba-wrapped remains of Ranavalona III were the only ones that could be saved from the flames. These have since been re-interred in the royal tombs at Ambohimanga.

Following Ranavalona's death, her aunt Ramasindrazana left Algeria and moved to Alpes-Maritimes where she lived out the few remaining years of her life. The heir-apparent, Marie-Louise, had left Ranavalona's villa several years earlier to study at a French high school and would go on to marry a French agricultural engineer named Andre Bosshard on 24 June 1921. Although she continued to receive a small pension from the French government throughout her lifetime, Marie-Louise chose to pursue a career as a nurse and was awarded the Legion of Honour for her medical services during World War II. After Bosshard and the childless Marie-Louise divorced, the young woman reportedly made the most of her new-found freedom as a flamboyant and vivacious socialite. Marie-Louise died in Bazoches-sur-le-Betz on 18 January 1948, without leaving any descendants, and was buried in Montreuil, France.

== Legacy ==
An archive of fashion, photographs and letters telling the story of Ranavalona was bought at auction by the island's government in 2020, having been discovered in an attic in Guildford, Surrey. The collection had been owned by Clara Herbert, who worked for the Malagasy royal family from the 1890s to 1920s, and had been passed down through her family.

L'Aube rouge is a historical novel about the Franco-Hova wars by the Malagasy writer Jean-Joseph Rabearivelo, largely focusing on Ranavalona III.

== See also ==
- Crown of Ranavalona III
- History of Madagascar
- Merina Kingdom
- Andy Razaf (grand-nephew)

== Bibliography ==
- Andrianjafitrimo, Lantosoa (2007). La femme malgache en Imerina au début du XXIe siècle. Paris: Karthala Editions. ISBN 9782845864764.
- Barrier, Marie-France (1996). Ranavalona, dernière reine de Madagascar. Paris: Balland. ISBN 978-2-7158-1094-5.
- Basset, Charles (1903). Madagascar et l'oeuvre du Général Galliéni. Paris: A. Rousseau.
- Bergougniou, Jean-Michel; Clignet, Rémi; David, Philippe (2001). "Villages noirs" et autres visiteurs africains et malgaches en France et en Europe: 1870–1940. Paris: Karthala Editions. ISBN 978-2-84586-200-5.
- "Crownless Monarchs". The Bookman. No. 26. London: Dodd Mead & Co. 1908. p. 118.
- Campbell, Gwyn (1991). "The Menalamba revolt and brigandry in imperial Madagascar, 1820–1897". International Journal of African Historical Studies. 24 (2): 259–291. doi:10.2307/219791. JSTOR 219791.
- Cousins, William Edward (1895). Madagascar of to-day. The Religious Tract Society. p. 73.
- Curtin, Philip D. (1998). Disease and empire: the health of European troops in the conquest of Africa. Cambridge, Massachusetts: Cambridge University Press. ISBN 978-0-521-59835-4.
- Massachusetts Reformatory (1 October 1904). "Kings in Exile". Our Paper. 20 (40): 639.
- Ministère de la marine et des colonies (1884). Revue maritime et coloniale, Volume 81. Paris: Gouvernement de la France.
- Nativel, Didier (2005). Maisons royales, demeures des grands à Madagascar. Antananarivo, Madagascar: Karthala Éditions. ISBN 978-2-84586-539-6.
- Priestley, Herbert Ingram (1967) [1938]. France overseas: a study of modern imperialism. Octagon Books. p. 305. ISBN 978-0-7146-1024-5.
- Randrianja, Solofo (2001). Société et luttes anticoloniales à Madagascar: de 1896 à 1946. Paris: Karthala Editions. ISBN 978-2-84586-136-7.
- Roland, Oliver; Fage, John; Sanderson, G.N. (1985). The Cambridge history of Africa. Vol. 6. Cambridge, UK: Cambridge University Press. ISBN 978-0-521-22803-9.
- Saillens, Pasteur R. (1906). "Impressions of Algeria". The Missionary Review of the World. Vol. 29. London: Funk & Wagnalls. p. 449.
- Stratton, Arthur (1964). The Great Red Island. Berlin: Scribner.
- Stuart Robson, Isabel (1896). "The Childhood of a Queen IV: The Queen of Madagascar". Children's Friend. Vol. 36. London: S.W. Partridge & Co.
- Titcomb, Mary (November 1896). "Madagascar and the Malagasy". Frank Leslie's Popular Monthly.
- Trotter Matthews, Thomas (1904). Thirty years in Madagascar. London: A. C. Armstrong.

Regnal titles
Preceded by Ranavalona II	Queen of Madagascar; 30 July 1883 – 28 February 1897	Monarchy abolished
