= Razafinandriamanitra =

Malagasy princess

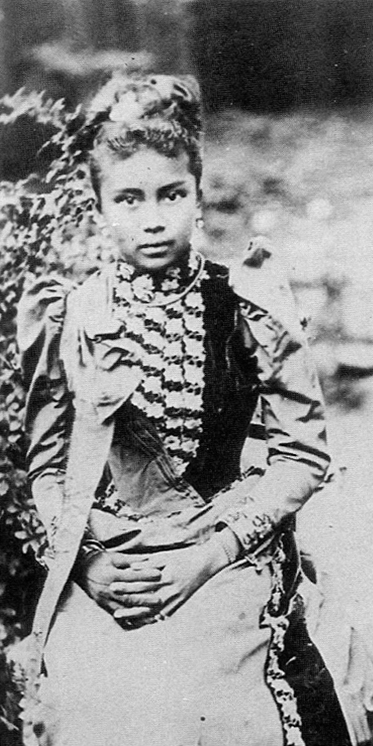
- Born: 1882; Kingdom of Madagascar
- Died: 6 May 1897 (aged 14–15); Hotel de l'Europe, Saint-Denis, Réunion, France
- Burial: Saint-Denis Cemetery
- Issue: Princess Marie-Louise of Madagascar
- Dynasty: Hova
- Father: Andrianaly
- Mother: Princess Rasendranoro of Madagascar

Princess Razafinandriamanitra of Madagascar (1882 – 1897) was a member of the Malagasy royal family and a niece of Ranavalona III. She was the heiress presumptive of the Kingdom of Madagascar until the monarchy was abolished in 1897.

== Biography ==
Princess Razafinandriamanitra was born in 1882 as a member of the Malagasy royal family. She was the daughter of Andrianaly and Princess Rasendranoro, a sister of Queen Ranavalona III. She was recognized as the heiress presumptive to the throne of Madagascar.

At the age of fourteen, during French occupation of Madagascar, Razafinandriamanitra became pregnant by a French soldier. On 28 February 1897 the monarchy was abolished and France took complete control over the Malagasy government. Razafinandriamanitra accompanied her mother and Princess Ramasindrazana to join her aunt, Queen Ranavalona III, in Toamasina after she was removed from the palace by French troops. Together they boarded the ship La Peyrouse and left for Réunion to live in exile. They arrived in Pointe des Galets where they were met by an angry crowd. They were taken from the port city to Saint-Denis and took up residence in the Hotel de l'Europe. On 1 May 1897 Razafinandriamanitra gave birth to a daughter, Marie-Louise. Razafinandriamanitra died on 6 May 1897, five days after giving birth. She was buried in a cemetery in Saint-Denis. Her daughter was later adopted by the queen and became the next heiress presumptive.
