= Raketaka =

19th-century Madagascar princess

- Born: Razanakinimanjaka; 1824
- Died: 1866 (aged 41–42)
- Issue: Ranavalona III; Rasendranoro
- House: Sakalava (by birth); Merina (by marriage)
- Father: Radama I
- Mother: Rasalimo

Princess Raketaka of Madagascar (August 1824 – 1866) was heir to the throne of Madagascar until her father Radama I died.

== Biography ==
=== Early life ===
Raketaka was born in Antananarivo in August 1824. She was the youngest child of King Radama I and Queen Rasalimo. Rasalimo was the daughter of King Ramitraho of Menabe. She was born in August 1824 and had two sisters, Ratsiadala and Ramarivelo. Prior to her birth, Radama I had intended for his nephew Rakotobe to inherit the crown, however on her birth it was decided they would marry and she would become Queen.

After the death of Radama I in 1828, there was turmoil as to who should become sovereign. Some parties supported Raketaka's claim to the throne. However, power was assumed by her step-mother, the king's first wife, Ranavalona I. She believed that there was not enough popular support for any of her step-daughters, particularly Raketaka, who was very young. She did put two men to death for giving vocal support to Raketaka assuming the throne. Supporters of Radama wanted to manipulate the infant Raketaka and rule behind the scenes. However many relatives of the king were killed by Ranavalona to ensure her own accession was secure, but Raketaka was spared because she had Sakalava ancestry. Raketaka was present at her father's funeral.

By 1838, Raketaka was the only surviving child of Radama I.

=== Marriage ===
Raketaka married her cousin Andriantsimianatra. They had nine children. Their daughter Razafindrahety, who was born in 1861, inherited the Merina throne in 1883 and became Queen Ranavalona III. Her mother's lineage was an important factor in Ranavalona II's decision to make Razafindrahety her heir. Another daughter, Rasendranoro was exiled to Réunion by the French government. Some of the rest of Raketaka's descendants have spread across Madagascar.

Raketaka died in 1866 and was buried in Ampasanimalo.

== See also ==
- Lists of princesses
