= Jacques Berthieu =

French Roman Catholic saint

Saint Jacques Berthieu S.J.
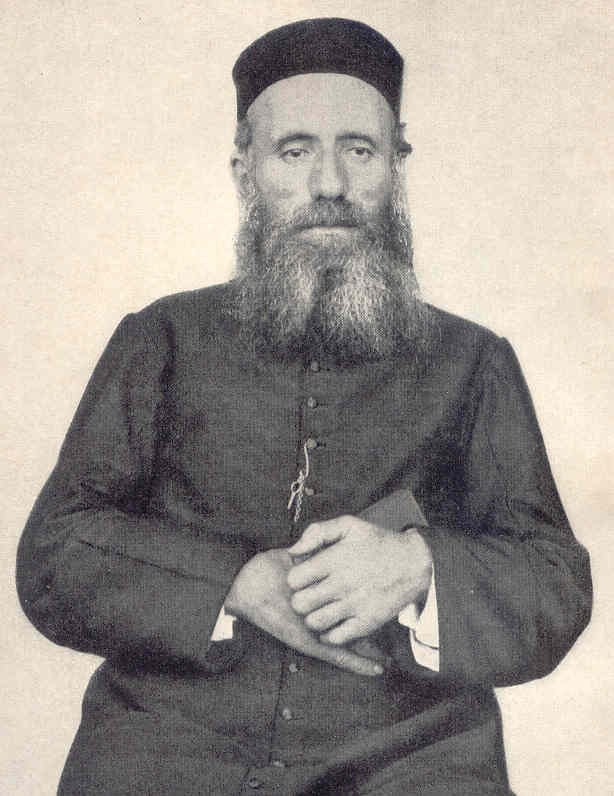

Martyr Apostle of Madagascar
- Born: 27 November 1838; Polminhac, Cantal, France
- Died: 8 June 1896 (aged 57); Ambiatibe, Madagascar
- Venerated in: Catholic Church (Society of Jesus)
- Beatified: 17 October 1965, Saint Peter's Basilica, Vatican City by Pope Paul VI
- Canonized: 21 October 2012, Vatican City by Pope Benedict XVI
- Feast: 08 June (Roman Catholic)

Jacques Berthieu, SJ (also James; 27 November 1838 – 8 June 1896) was a French Jesuit priest and missionary in Madagascar. He was murdered during the Menalamba rebellion of 1896. He is the first martyr of Madagascar to be beatified. He was canonized by Pope Benedict XVI in 2012.

== Biography ==
Jacques Berthieu was born on 27 November 1838 in the area of Montlogis, in Polminhac, in the Auvergne in central France, the son of deeply Christian farmers of modest means. His childhood was spent working and studying, surrounded by his family. The early death of an older sister left him the oldest of six children. He studied at the seminary of Saint-Flour and was ordained to the priesthood for the diocese on 21 May 1864. His bishop, de Pompignac, named him vicar in Roannes-Saint-Mary, where he replaced an ill and aged priest. He served as a diocesan priest for nine years.

Because of his desire to evangelize distant lands, and to ground his spiritual life in the Spiritual Exercises of Saint Ignatius of Loyola, he sought admission to the Society of Jesus and entered the novitiate in Pau, Pyrénées-Atlantiques, on 31 October 1873, at the age of almost thirty-five.

== Mission ==
He sailed from the port of Marseille in 1875 to two islands in the vicinity of Madagascar that were then under French jurisdiction, Réunion and Sainte-Marie, where he studied Malagasy and prepared himself for the mission. The beginnings of his missionary life were not easy for this 37-year-old Jesuit. Climate, language, and culture were all totally new things which made him exclaim, "My uselessness and my spiritual misery serve to humiliate me, but not to discourage me. I await the hour when I can do something, with the grace of God". Mindful of his farming background, he was happy to cultivate the kitchen garden that supplied the station. He and two other Jesuits and the Sisters of St. Joseph of Cluny formed a missionary team. There he was engaged in pastoral work for five years, until March 1880.

== Madagascar ==
In 1881, French legislation closed French territories to Jesuits, a measure which compelled Berthieu to relocate to the large island of Madagascar, an independent kingdom at that time. He went first to Toamasina and then to Antananarivo until his superiors sent him to the far-off mission of Ambohimandroso, near Betsileo.

The outbreak of the first French-Malagasy war in 1883 forced him to move again. From 1886 on, he supervised the mission of Ambositra, 250 km south of Antananarivo. After a stay in Ambositra of five years, he went to Andrainarivo in 1891. This post was northeast of the capital and had 18 mission-stations to look after, situated in the most remote and inaccessible places.

== Insurrection of 1896 ==
France captured the royal palaces in September 1894 and declared Madagascar its possession, sparking the Menalamba ("red shawl") revolt against European influence. Europeans and Malagasy Christians were targeted by organized and armed Hova units. Berthieu sought to place the Christians under the protection of French troops. Deprived of this protection by a French colonel whom Berthieu had chastised for his behavior with the women of the country, Berthieu led a convoy of Christians towards Antananarivo and stopped in the village of Ambohibemasoandro. On 8 June 1896 Menalamba fighters entered the village and found Berthieu hiding in the house of a Protestant friend. They seized him and stripped him of his cassock. One of them snatched his crucifix from him, saying: "Is this your amulet? Is it thus that you mislead the people? Will you continue to pray for a long time?" He responded: "I have to pray until I die." One of them then struck Berthieu's forehead with a machete; Berthieu fell to his knees, bleeding profusely. The Menalamba then led him away for what would be a long trek.

After about a ten-kilometer march, they reached the village of Ambohitra where the church Berthieu had built was located. One of his captors objected that it would not be possible for Berthieu to enter the camp because his presence would desecrate the nearby sampy, the idols held sacred by traditional communities at that time. They threw a stone at him three times, and the third time Berthieu fell prostrate. Not far from the village, since Berthieu was sweating, a Menalamba took Berthieu's handkerchief, soaked it in mud and dirty water, and tied it around Berthieu's head, as they jeered at him, shouting: "Behold the king of the Vazaha (Europeans)". Some then went on to emasculate him, which resulted in a fresh loss of blood that further exhausted him.

== Death ==
As night drew near, in Ambiatibe, a village 50 kilometers north of Antananarivo, after some deliberation, a decision was made to kill Berthieu. The chief gathered a platoon of six men armed with guns. At the sight, Berthieu knelt down. Two men fired simultaneously at him, but missed. Berthieu made the sign of the cross and bowed his head. One of the chiefs approached him and said: "Give up your hateful religion, do not mislead the people anymore, and we will make you our counselor and our chief, and we will spare you." He replied: "I cannot consent to this; I prefer to die." Berthieu bowed his head in prayer once more, two men fired but missed him. Another fired a fifth shot, which hit Berthieu without killing him. He remained on his knees. A last shot, fired at close range, finally killed Berthieu. His body was dumped into the Mananara River and was never recovered.

== Veneration ==
The cause for Berthieu's beatification was formally opened on 26 June 1940, granting him the title of Servant of God. He was declared venerable in 1964, and was beatified by Paul VI on 17 October 1965. He has been celebrated liturgically on 8 June by the French Province of the Society of Jesus, and February 4 by the rest of the Society. Jacques Berthieu was canonized on 21 October 2012, Mission Sunday, by Pope Benedict XVI.

== Quotes ==
"God knows I love and if I still love and patriae fine dulcis Alverniae arva (the native soil and the beloved land of Auvergne). And yet God gives me the grace to love more these uncultivated fields of Madagascar, where I can only catch a few souls for our Lord." ..."The mission progresses, while the fruits are still in hope and in many places barely visible in others. But what does it matter, as long as we are good sowers, God will give growth in his own time."

== Sources ==
- Boudou, A., J. Berthieu, Paris, 1935
- Blot, B., He loved to the end, Fianarantsoa, 1965.
- Sartre, Victor, Blessed Jacques Berthieu, martyr Madagascar, Lille, 1996.
