= Crown of Ranavalona III =

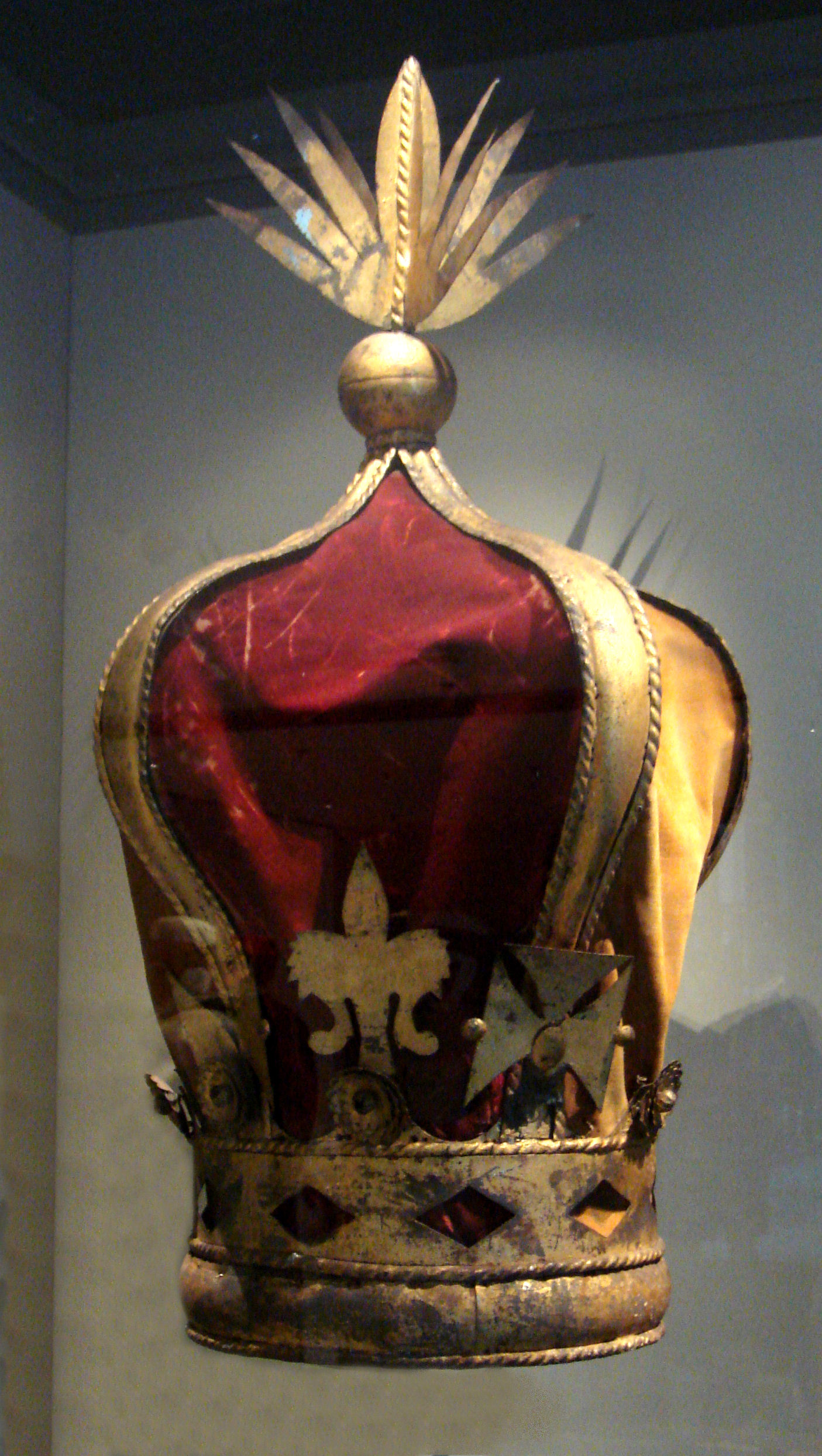
Crowning of a royal canopy called the Crown of Queen Ranavalona III, Paris, Army Museum

The "crown" of Queen Ranavalona III is a decorative element, mostly made of zinc, that was set on top of a royal canopy used by Ranavalona III (22 November 1861 – 23 May 1917) during the ceremony of declaration of war against France in 1895.

While it is not a crown, but rather a golden zinc ornament from a ceremonial canopy, it has been known for years as the "crown of Queen Ranavalona III." This name stems from a confusion with the crown of Queen Ranavalona I, which Queen Ranavalona III wore during her coronation. That specific crown was stolen from the Andafiavaratra Palace in 2011 and remains missing.

== Location ==
Till 2020, this "crown" of a royal canopy was exhibited in Paris, France at the Army Museum, which is housed within the French Hôtel National des Invalides National Palace. The object was donated in 1910 to the museum by Georges Richard, former mayor of Saint-Denis, Réunion between 1893 and 1896. From 2020, this decorative object was lend by French state in order to be exhibited in Rova of Antananarivo.

== See also ==
- Les Invalides
- Ranavalona III
- Merina Kingdom
- Madagascar
- Crown jewels
