= Menalamba rebellion =

1895–1897 uprising in Madagascar against French rule

Date	December 1895 – May 1897 (sporadic clashes until 1903)
Location	Madagascar
Result	Rebellion suppressed: End of the Kingdom of Imerina

Belligerents
(France) French Empire: (France) French Madagascar	Merina rebels Marofotsy; Manendy

Commanders and leaders
(France) Joseph Gallieni (France) Hubert Lyautey	Rabozaka; Rabezavana; Rainibetsimisaraka

Casualties and losses
- Hundreds to 100,000 dead

The Menalamba rebellion was an uprising in Madagascar by the Merina people that emerged in central Madagascar in response to the French capture of the royal palace in the capital city of Antananarivo in September 1895. It spread rapidly in 1896, threatening the capital, but French forces were successful in securing the surrender of many rebel groups in 1897. Elements of the rebellion continued sporadically until 1903. Menalamba rebels were mostly outlaws called "Fahavalo" led by Rabozaka and Rabezavana in the region of Anjozorobe between Alaotra lake and Betsiboka river and Rainibetsimisaraka in the region of Vakinankaratra.

== Background ==
French diplomatic and military claims over the island of Madagascar – ongoing for more than four decades – intensified under the reigns of Queen Ranavalona II and Queen Ranavalona III, the island's final monarchs. Following a successful campaign under General Jacques Duchesne, the Queen surrendered on 14 September 1895. On 1 October 1895, the Merina Kingdom signed a treaty with France wherein it became a French protectorate. Upon the queen's signing of the treaty, the French government deposed Rainilaiarivony from his position as prime minister and commander-in-chief, and then exiled him to French Algeria On 6 February 1896. Queen Ranavalona III and much of her administration remained but were afforded no real political power. A civil governor, Hippolyte Laroche, was initially appointed to administer the territory.

== Outbreak ==
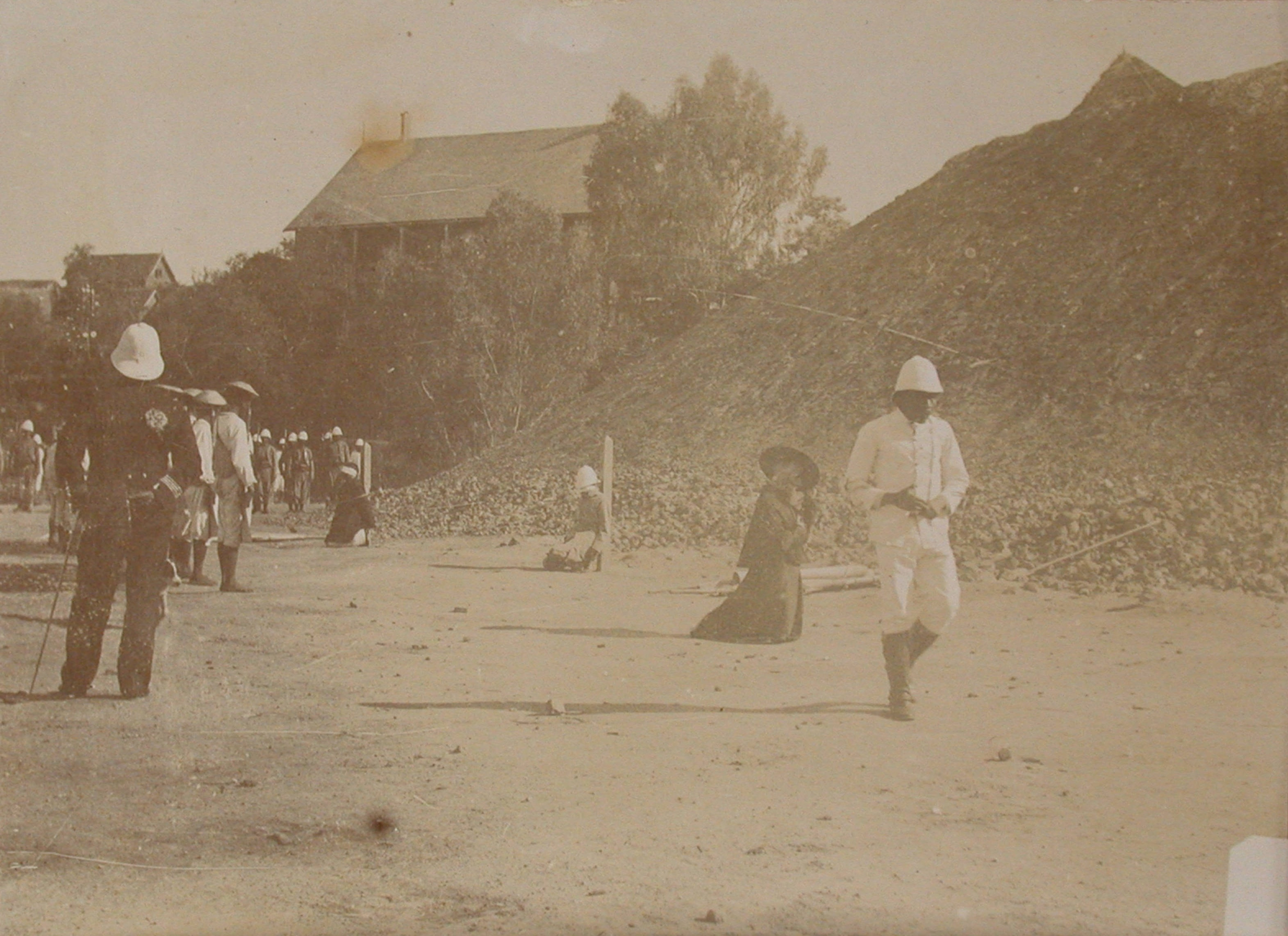
Execution of Rainandriamampandry and Ratsimamanga, Madagascar, 1896 (impa-m28578)

In December 1895, two months after the French capture of Antananarivo, popular resistance to French rule emerged in the form of the menalamba ("red shawl") uprising, principally conducted by common peasants who wore shawls smeared with the red laterite soil of the highlands. This guerrilla war against foreigners, Christianity, and political corruption, quickly spread throughout the island. The rebellion did not seek to restore the authority of the queen, as the conversion of the leading members of the royal family was regarded by the rebels as the cause of cosmic chaos. The rebellion was based in peripheral regions far from the capital, already the abode of brigands, runaway slaves and deserters. One if its main motivations was the restoration of traditional ancestor veneration. Another was the rejection of corvee labour (fanompoana), on which had become increasingly common in the Malagasy political order and which the church promoted and relied on.

The rebellion broke out only a few days after the French took Antananarivo. It began spontaneously in multiple centres and lacked any unified leadership or coordination. Lacking central coordination, as the revolt developed it encompassed both religious traditionalists and popular Christian preachers, and although it rejected the corrupt old political order, it maintained links with the palace.

The scale and danger of the rebellion was not immediately obvious to the French, who at first they were only dealing with isolated outbreaks of violence. However, in March 1896, a full-scale uprising began, taking them by surprise. The indication that something different was happening was a wave of coordinated attacks on administrative posts of the Malagasy royal government in that month.

Members of Ranavalona's court were accused of encouraging the rebels and on October 15, 1896, General Joseph Gallieni executed the queen's uncle Ratsimamanga (brother of her favored adviser, Ramisindrazana) and her Minister of War, Rainandriamampandry. Ramisindrazana, the queen's aunt, was exiled to Réunion in 1897, because the French colonial administration was reluctant to execute a woman.

The resistance led the government of France to replace the island's civil governor with Gallieni as the military governor. It was also a principal factor in the decision to exile Ranavalona to Réunion later that same year.

== The height of the rebellion ==
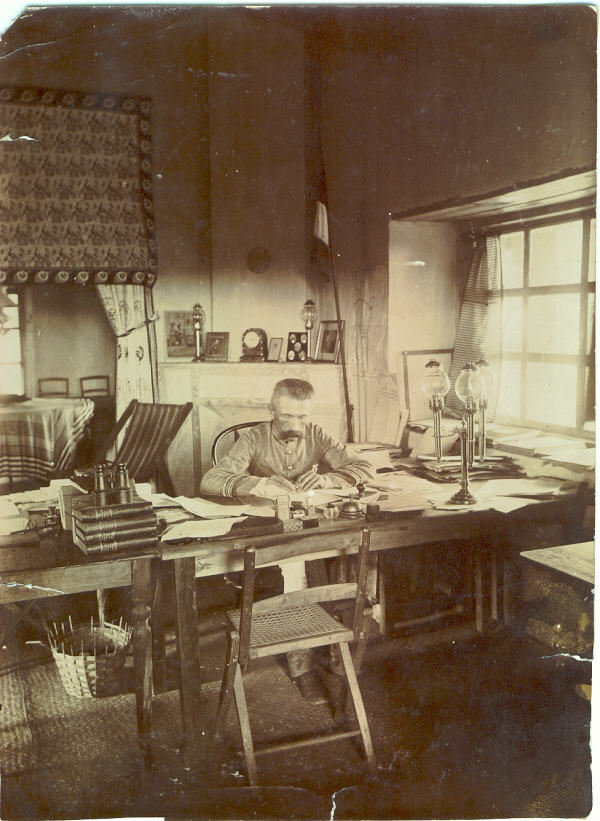
Lyautey in Madagascar, 1898

At its height, the rebellion may have controlled territory with as many as 300,000 people. The rebels were able to impose a blockade on Antananarivo in July, August, and September 1896, and in the latter month, a state of siege was declared in the capital.

There was a belief among some of the rebels – particularly Protestants, that the British would arrive to support them against the French. However, this hope for support never materialised and by 1897 hunger was forcing rebel groups to negotiate for surrender. One, in the north of the country, led by Rabezavana, surrendered to Hubert Lyautey in May 1897.

== Suppression ==
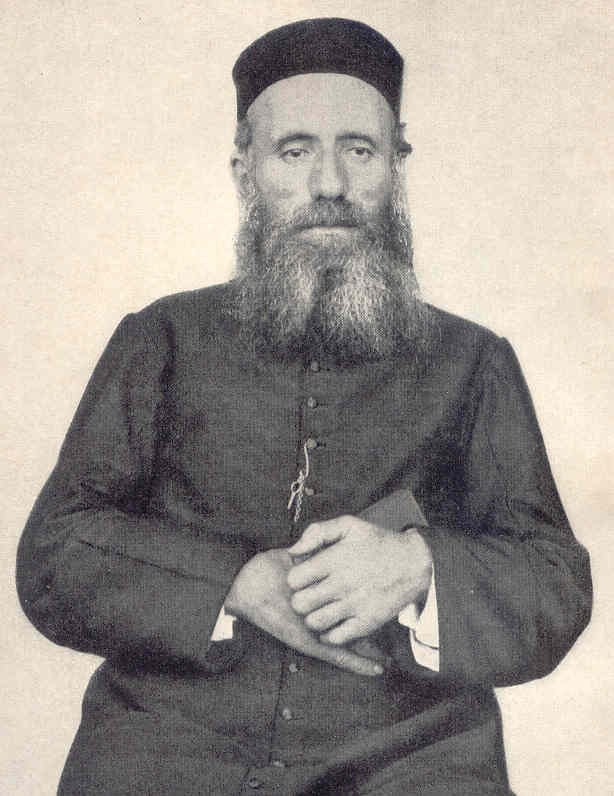
Jacques Berthieu (1838–1896)

The French government determined that a civil governor was incapable of ensuring order and submission of the Malagasy people, and so deposed the queen in 1897, dissolved Merina monarchy, and installed a military government headed by Gallieni. Queen Ranavalona III was exiled to Réunion and later to Algeria, where she died in 1917 without ever being allowed to return to Madagascar.

The resistance movement was mostly put down by the French military by 1900, although revolts continued in west, northwest and east Madagascar until 1903.

The rebellion destroyed hundreds of churches and killed an unknown number of Malagasy religious figures as well as five foreign missionaries. Jacques Berthieu, a Jesuit priest executed by the rebellion, was declared a martyr and saint of the Catholic Church in 2012.

The number of Malagasy deaths as a result of the rebellion may have reached 100,000, while French deaths – from disease as well as violent causes – were in the hundreds.

== Bibliography ==
- Randrianja, Solofo (2001). Société et luttes anticoloniales à Madagascar: de 1896 à 1946 (in French). Paris: Karthala Editions. pp. 100–110. ISBN 978-2-84586-136-7.
- Basset, Charles (1903). Madagascar et l'oeuvre du Général Galliéni (in French). Paris: A. Rousseau. pp. 140–142.
