= Marius Cazeneuve =

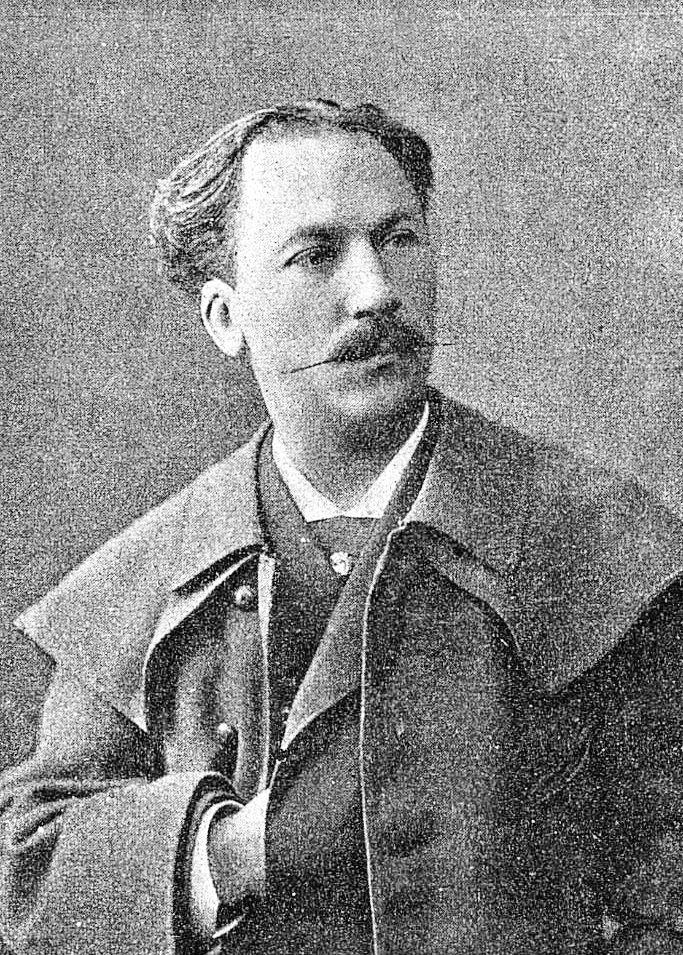
- Marius Cazeneuve
- Born: 12 October 1839; Toulouse, France
- Died: 12 April 1913 (aged 73); Toulouse, France
- Other name: Commander Cazeneuve
- Occupation: Stage magician
- Known for: Friendship with Ranavalona III of Madagascar; role in the French conquest of Madagascar

Marius Cazeneuve, also known as Commander Cazeneuve (Toulouse October 12, 1839 – Toulouse, April 12, 1913) was a French stage magician, who became a close friend of the queen of Madagascar, Ranavalona III, and played a role in the French conquest of Madagascar.

== Biography ==
=== Early career ===
Marius Cazeneuve was born in Toulouse in 1839, in a poor family that could not afford for him a regular education. He was introduced in the circus milieu by Jules Léotard and developed skills as a stage magician. He worked with Madrid's Oriental Circus, then returned to Toulouse, where he became the assistant of Bartolomeo Bosco. He went on to establish his own company, and performed all over Europe, in the Middle East, and Northern Africa, reportedly becoming one of the richest European magicians of his generation.

In 1870, during the Franco-Prussian War, he formed at his expenses a company of volunteers, later becoming a captain in the regular French army.

=== Madagascar ===
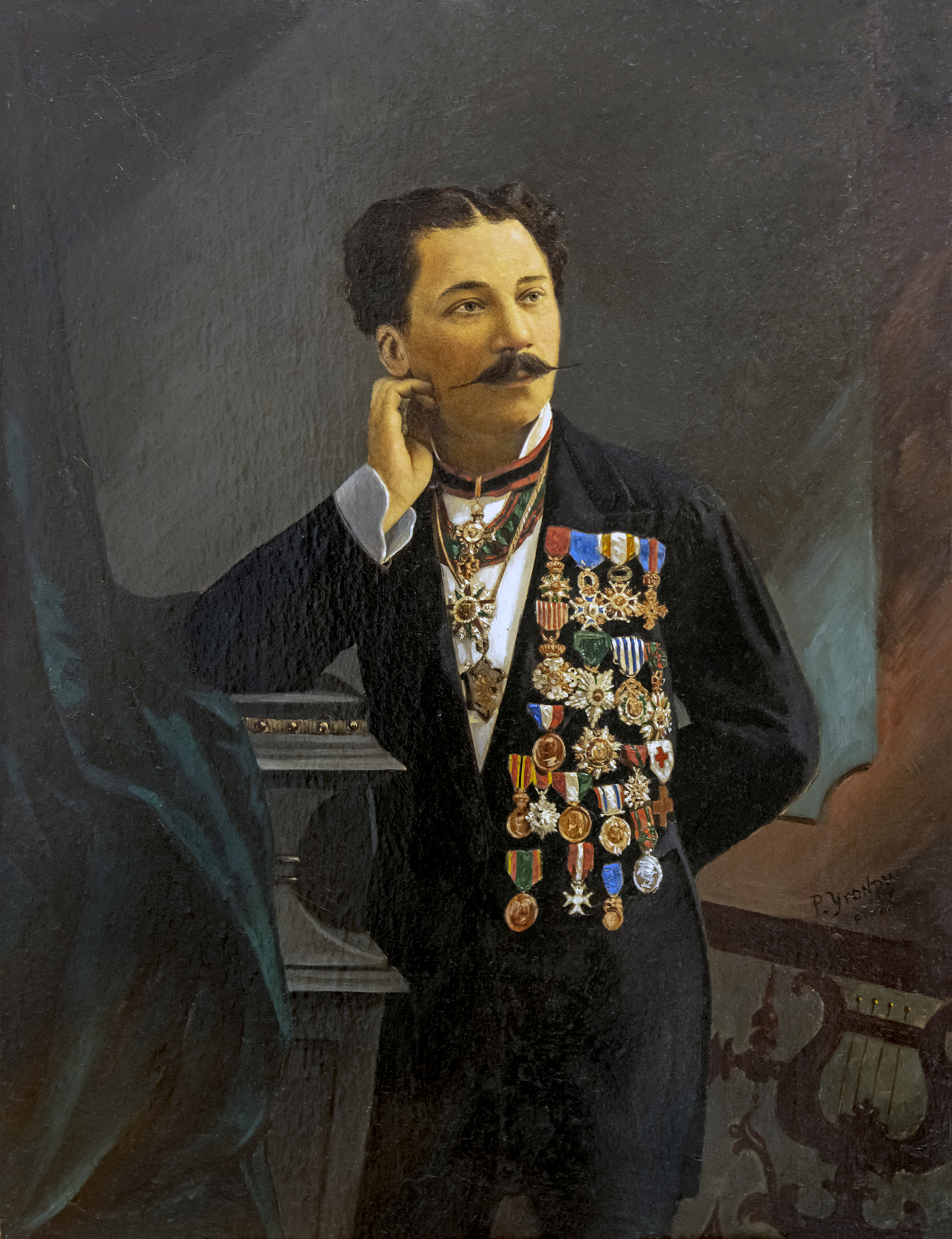
Le Commandeur Marius Cazeneuve, by Pierre Yrondi, Musée du Vieux Toulouse, Toulouse

In 1886, Cazeneuve arrived in Madagascar. He had been invited by queen Ranavalona III to perform at her court. Reportedly, and unbeknownst to the queen, he also went there as a French intelligence agent, charged with the mission of promoting French against British influence in Madagascar. His performances there included humorous shows lampooning the British. Several accounts, including his own autobiography published in 1896, suggested that Cazeneuve entered into a romantic relationship with the queen. Historians believe that, while the autobiography may have included some exaggeration, Cazeneuve did work for the French intelligence, and contributed to the eventual conquest of Madagascar by France in 1897.

It seems that the queen maintained her affection for Cazeneuve after she went into exile, and visited him in France in 1901.

=== Late career ===
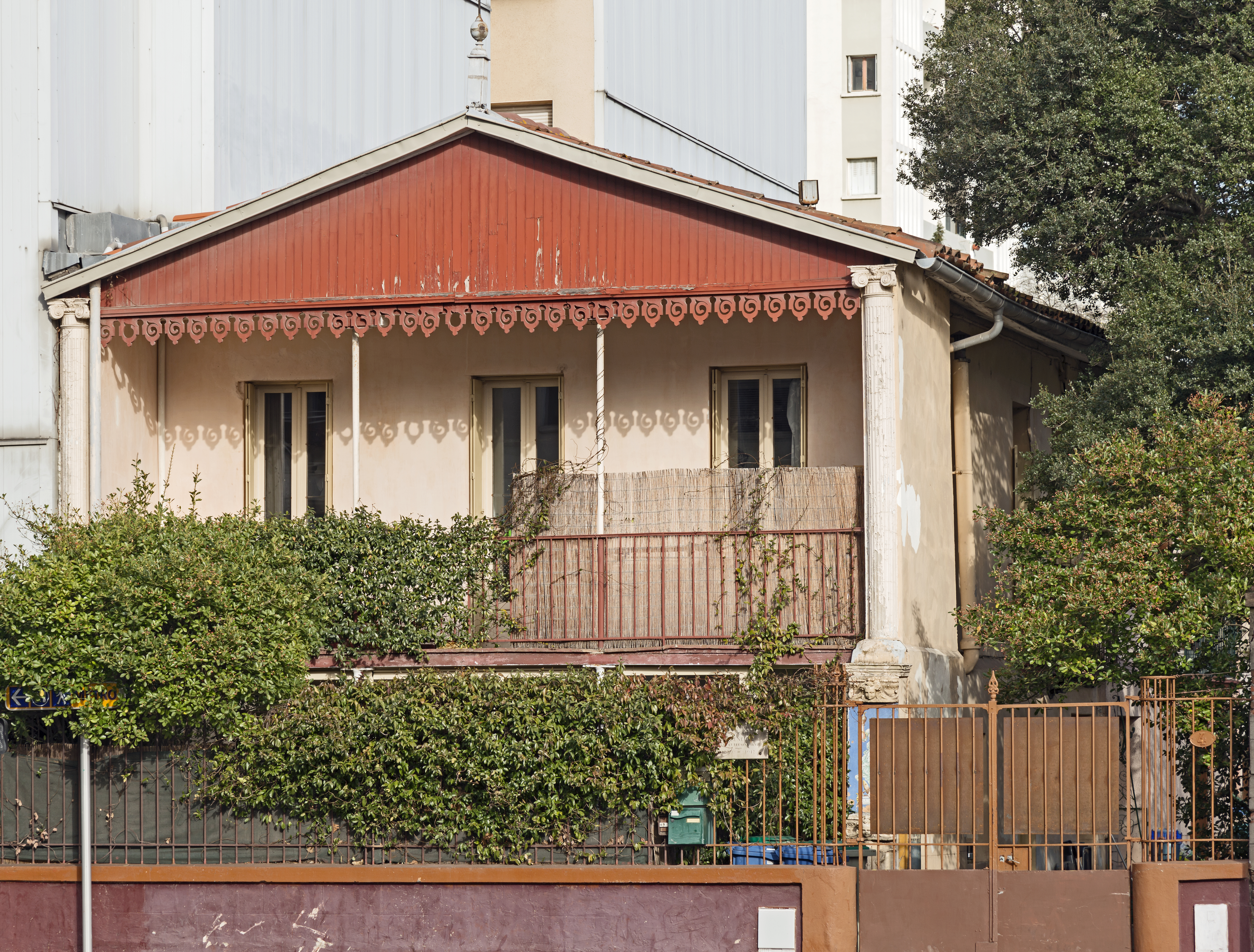
Maison du Commandeur, Toulouse

After the French conquest of Madagascar, Cazeneuve returned to Europe, where he performed again as a well-paid magician, and collected important works of arts. He died in his home city in 1913. His residence, the "House of the Commander" (Maison du Commandeur), was protected as a historical monument in 1981. In 1960, novelist Pierre Benoit told Cazeneuve's story in his novel Le Commandeur.

== Book by Marius Cazeneuve ==
- À la cour de Madagascar, magie et diplomatie, Paris: Ch. Delagrave, 1896.

== Bibliography ==
- Benoit, Pierre (1960). Le Commandeur, Paris: Albin Michel. ISBN 978-2226278296.
- Dousset, Jean-Luc (2018). Commandeur Cazeneuve. Le magicien était un aventurier. Le Puy-en-Velay: Éditions Jeanne d'Arc. ISBN 978-2362620744.
- Saliès, Pierre (1983). Le Commandeur Marius Cazeneuve. Toulouse: Éditions Milan. ISBN 978-2867260179.
