= Rasendranoro =

Malagasy princess

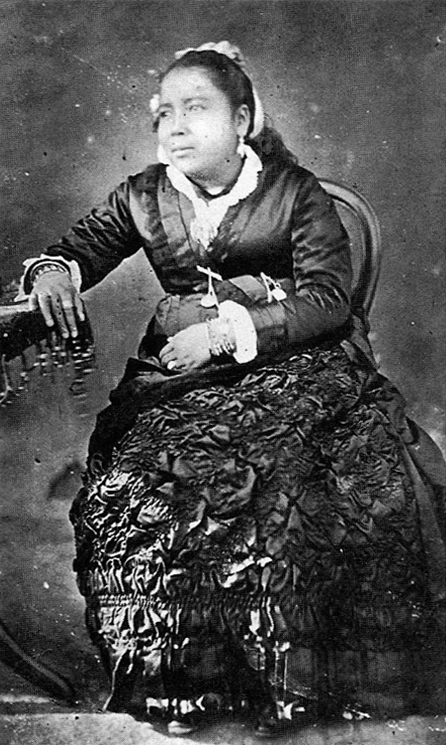
- Photograph of Rasendranoro, undated
- Born: 1860; Kingdom of Madagascar
- Died: 9 December 1901 (aged 40—41); Algiers
- Spouse: Andrianaly
- Issue: Prince Rakatomena; Princess Rasoherina; Princess Razafinandriamanitra
- Dynasty: Hova
- Father: Andriantsimianatra
- Mother: Princess Raketaka

Princess Rasendranoro of Madagascar (1860 – 9 December 1901) was a member of the Malagasy royal family and the older sister of Ranavalona III.

== Biography ==
Princess Rasendranoro was the daughter of Princess Raketaka of Madagascar and Andriantsimianatra. She was an older sister of Ranavalona III. She moved into an apartment in the royal palace after her sister was crowned queen. In 1881 Rasendranoro married a nobleman named Andrianaly. She had three children.

In 1897, after the monarchy was abolished and French colonial rule was enforced, Rasendranoro, along with her daughter and her aunt, Princess Ramasindrazana, joined the queen in Toamasina. They took a ship to Réunion, where they lived in exile. The party arrived in Pointe des Galets and were taken to Saint-Denis. They took up residence in the Hotel de l'Europe. A few days after arriving, Rasendranoro's daughter, Princess Razafinandriamanitra, died from complications related to childbirth. A month after arriving in Réunion, the royal family moved into a house owned by Madame de Villentroy, located near the government offices. Rasendranoro lived there for two years until the royal family was forced to move by the French government, and brought to Marseille. After living in France for a few months, they were transferred to French Algeria, and lived in a villa in Algiers.
