= Manendy =

Historical ethnic group and Merina caste in Madagascar

Regions with significant populations
- Northern and Western Imerina

Languages
- Merina

Related ethnic groups
- Vazimba, Merina people

The Manendy are a historical group from northern Imerina who form one of the three principal divisions of the Mainty group.

== Status ==
In Merina society, the Manendy belonged to the category of royal servants, along with the Manisotra and the Tsiarondahy, and were distinct from the slaves (Andevo). Two subdivisions existed:

- the Manendy Anativolo, linked to the region of Avaradrano;
- the Manendy Anosivola, associated with the Marovatana area.

These two groups formed part of the broader section known as the Mainty enin-dreny.

They were responsible for guarding royal cattle herds and, like the Ambaniandro, paid taxes for land granted to them for settlement and cultivation.

The Manendy were subject to endogamy.

== History ==
The Manendy are often described as autochthonous, with ancestral ties to the ancient Vazimba, particularly from the region of Valalafotsy.

The Manendy were among the tributaries of Andriamandisoarivo, together with the Antandrona, Sihanaka, Bezanozano and the Hova (Merina proper).

During the unification of Imerina under Andrianampoinimerina, the defection of Tsiampiry, chief of the Manendy, contributed directly to the fall of the kingdom of Marovatana. He was subsequently appointed governor of the newly integrated province.

After Andrianampoinimerina's annexation of central regions, many chiefs and inhabitants including numerous Manendy retreated to the kingdom of Boina. From there they launched repeated incursions into Merina territory, burning and pillaging villages. Andrianampoinimerina requested Queen Ravahiny of Boina to hand them over; she refused. He later made the same request to her successor Tsimaloma, asking at least for their expulsion. When this was again refused, he sent troops under Radama’s command, initiating the conflict that marked the downfall of the Volamena of Boina.

During the Menalamba rebellion (1895–1897), Manendy fighters joined the forces of Rabezavana, alongside several hundred Sakalava, Marofotsy, and Merina army deserters, resisting French colonial troops and carrying out raids across Imerina and Antsihanaka.
