= Hippolyte Laroche =

- Born: 26 January 1848; Lyon, France
- Died: 14 September 1914 (aged 66); Le Mans, Sarthe, France
- Occupations: Colonial administrator, politician
- Known for: Abolition of slavery in Madagascar

Hippolyte Laroche (26 January 1848 - 14 September 1914) was a French naval officer, colonial administrator and politician. While Resident General of Madagascar he succeeded in abolishing slavery.

== Career ==
Hippolyte Laroche was born on 26 January 1848 in Lyon, France. His father was a colonel of the Engineers. Laroche attended Naval Academy and became a naval officer. He was then made prefect of Charente, Algiers, Loire and Haute-Garonne.

Laroche was appointed Resident General in Madagascar, and arrived at Tananarive on 16 January 1896. Paul Anthelme Bourde was appointed Secretary General of Madagascar in 1895. Bourde left France for Madagascar in January 1896. He soon fell out with Laroche, who accused him of trying to usurp his position. In his short term of office, Laroche succeeded in passing a law that abolished slavery. He had the difficult task of keeping a balance between the French settlers and military and Queen Ranavalona III. He did not succeed since he had no control over the military, who pursued a scorched earth policy in suppressing an uprising of the local people. He left on 10 October 1896 when the government ended his mission.

Laroche signed the Adresse à Dreyfus that appeared in L'Aurore in September 1899. On 19 February 1904 Laroche was an unsuccessful candidate for the Assembly in a by-election for the arrondissement of La Flèche. In the general elections the next year he ran again and won by a narrow margin. He ran again in 1910 and was reelected. He was a member of commissions on Foreign affairs and the colonies, posts and telegraphs and the military.

Laroche died on 14 September 1914 in Le Mans, Sarthe, France.
