= Digby Willoughby (adventurer) =

British adventurer in Madagascar

Digby Willoughby (c. 1845–3 June 1901) was an English adventurer and mercenary.

== Life ==
Willoughby left England for South Africa in 1871 to seek his fortune. During the 1879 Anglo-Zulu War, he served as an officer in the Natal Mounted Police. He then for a time acted as auctioneer's assistant, subsequently becoming partner in the firm of Willoughby & Scoones at Maritzburg, where he resided. After a short period with a theatrical company, he raised and commanded an irregular troop, "Willoughby's Horse", which saw service in the Basuto Gun War of 1880.

In January 1884 Willoughby went to Madagascar, where, gaining the confidence of the Queen Ranavalona III and her husband Rainilaiarivony, the prime minister, he was appointed on 18 May general commander of the Hovas, the kingdom's armed forces (18 May). On the outbreak of the First Franco-Hova War next year he assembled and drilled an army of 20,000 soldiers. The Hovas, however, were heavily defeated.

At the close of the war in December 1885 Willoughby helped in negotiations with the French government, and went to London charged as plenipotentiary with a mission on behalf of the Malagasy government. Although he was well received, the British authorities did not recognise him, a British subject, as an envoy. The mission involved the negotiation of a loan; but when Willoughby returned to Madagascar, belatedly, he was charged with the misuse of funds, and expelled from the country.

Wearing the uniform of a British field-marshal, Willoughby ran a military spectacle at the Chicago Exhibition of 1893. In October of the same year, after the outbreak of the First Matabele War, went to Rhodesia. The war was almost over, but on the journey from Kimberley, he conferred with Cecil Rhodes, and reached Bulawayo just before the end of the campaign. He then assisted in the administration of Rhodesia.

In 1894 Willoughby was again in London, lecturing on the Matabele War. On the outbreak of the Second Matabele War in March 1896, he formed part of a council of defence at Bulawayo, under the acting administrator of Rhodesia. He revisited South Africa on the outbreak of the war there in 1899, but took no part in the fighting, and soon returned to England.

Willoughby, who had made a wealthy second marriage, was then ruined in health, and had lost an eye. He died at Goring-on-Thames, Oxfordshire, on 3 June 1901. He was a vivid raconteur of his experiences.
