= Ramasindrazana =

Malagasy princess

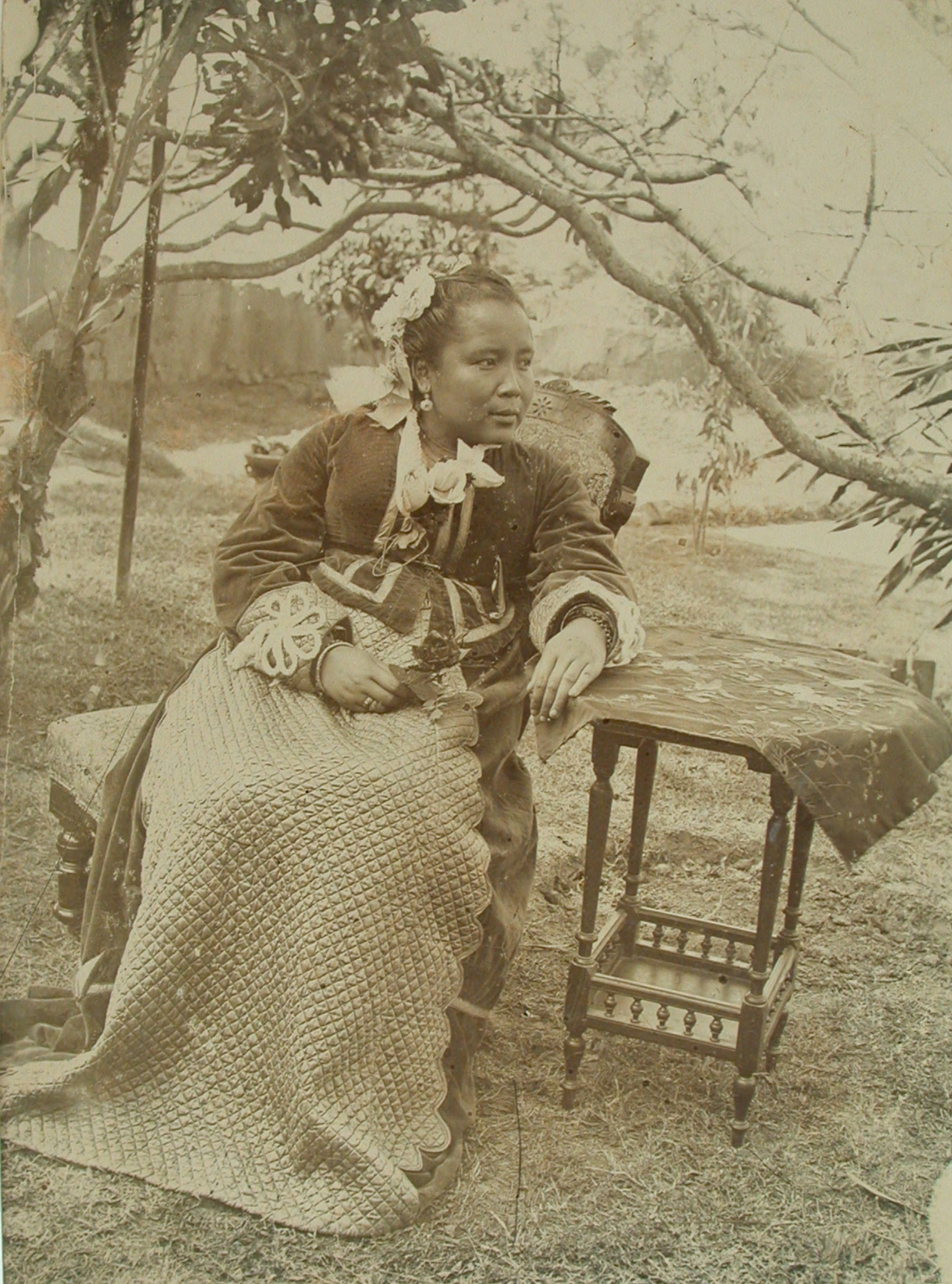
- Princess Ramasindrazana in 1890
- Born: Kingdom of Madagascar
- Died: 31 March 1924 (aged 80); Alpes-Maritimes; France
- Dynasty: Hova

Princess Ramasindrazana (died 1924) was a Malagasy royal and an aunt of Ranavalona III.

== Biography ==
Princess Ramasindrazana was a member of the Malagasy royal family. She was an aunt of Princess Rasendranoro and Ranavalona III, the last queen of Madagascar.

After the monarchy was abolished by French colonial rule in 1897, Ramasindrazana went into exile with other members of the royal family. Accompanied by Princess Rasendranoro and Princess Razafinandriamanitra, she joined Queen Ranavalona in Toamasina. From there they took a ship to Réunion and took up residence in the Hotel de l'Europe in Saint-Denis. After living in the hotel for a month, the royal family moved into a house near the government offices. While in Saint-Denis, she accompanied the queen during visits and public appearances, including visiting a new church under construction and meeting with the Governor of Réunion. Ramasindrazana lived there as part of the queen's household for almost two years until they were moved by the French government and brought to Marsielles. After living in France for two months, she accompanied the queen during a transfer to French Algeria. She moved into a villa in Algiers with the queen as part of the royal household.

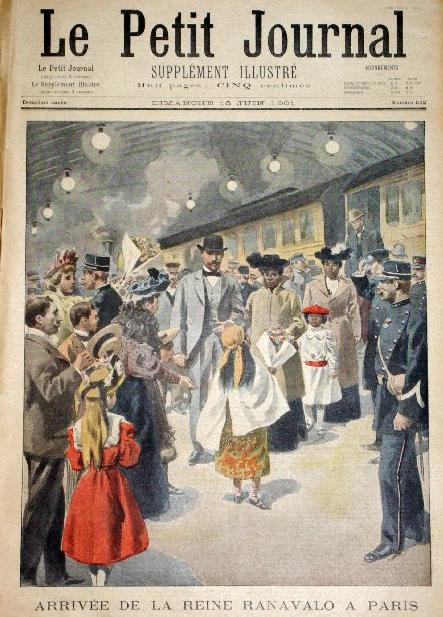
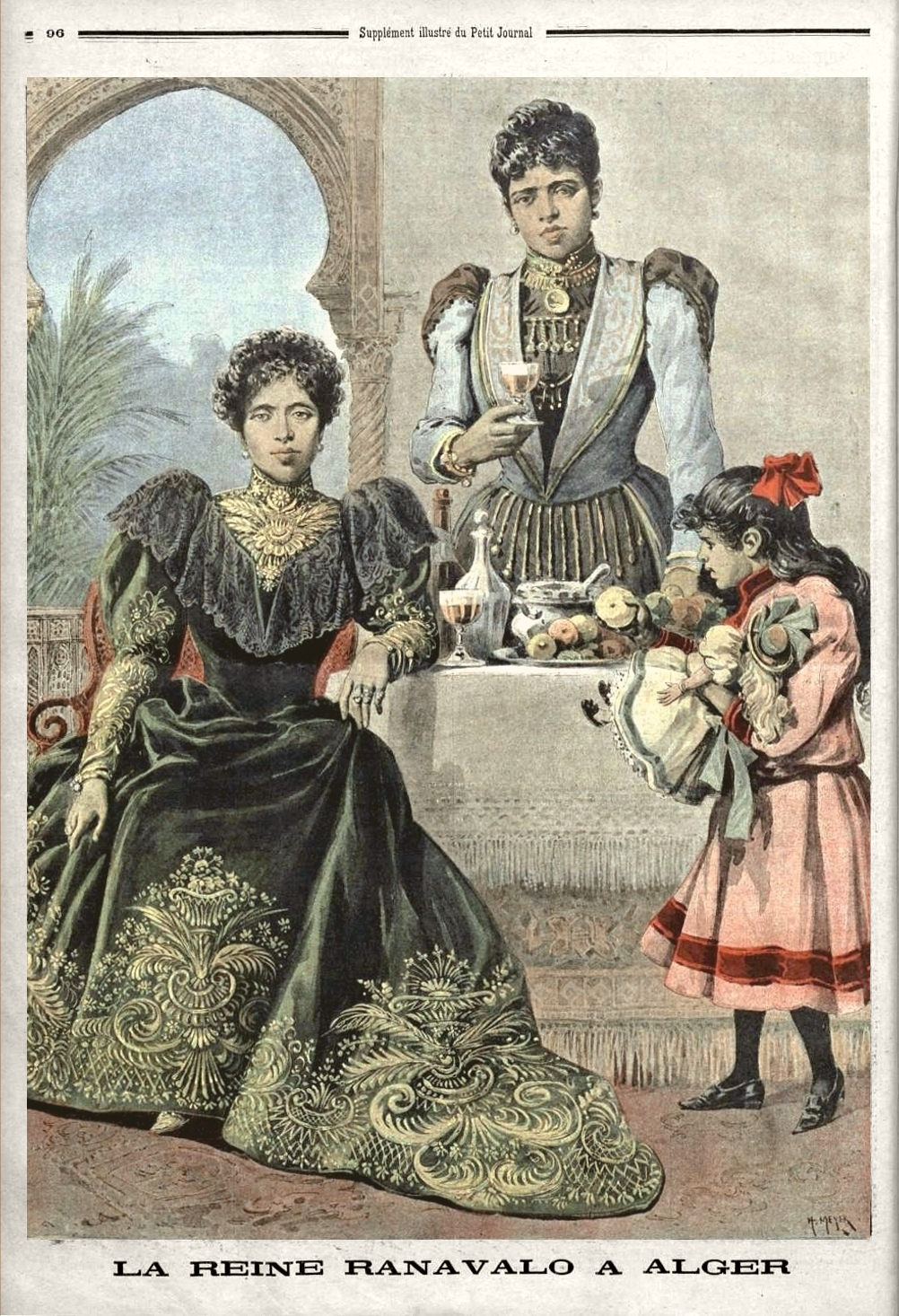
Ranavalona III's arrival in France for her first official visit, accompanied by Ramasindrazana and Marie-Louise in 1901 (left), and the royal trio in Algiers in 1899 (right)

When the queen died in 1917, Ramasindrazana left Algeria and moved to Alpes-Maritimes in France, where she lived until her death in 1924.
