= Bazoches-sur-le-Betz =

- Commune
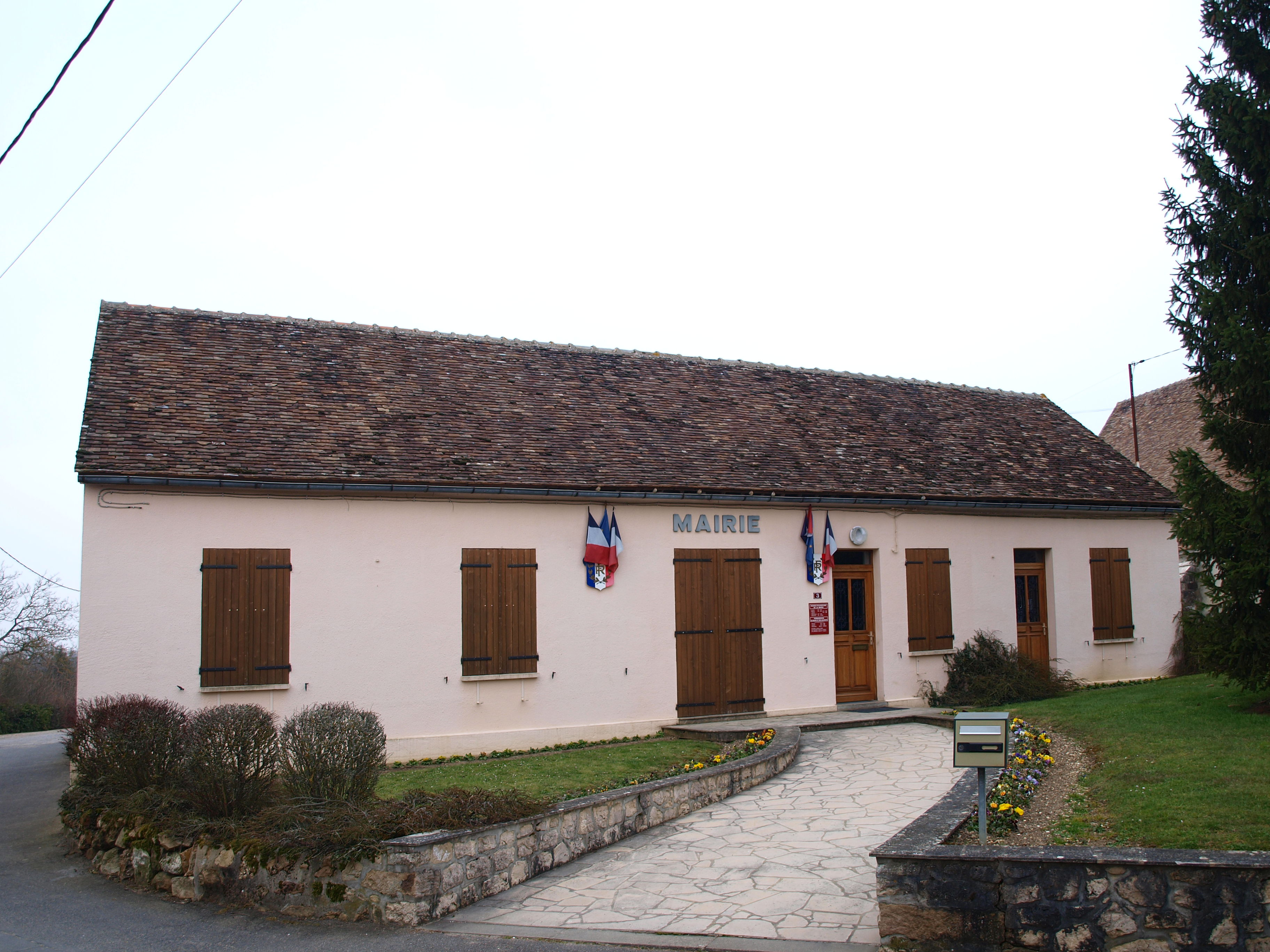
- The town hall in Bazoches-sur-le-Betz

- Coat of arms
- Location of Bazoches-sur-le-Betz
- Location within France Location within Centre-Val de Loire
- Coordinates: 48°08′01″N 2°59′14″E
- Country: France
- Region: Centre-Val de Loire
- Department: Loiret
- Arrondissement: Montargis
- Canton: Courtenay

Government
  - Mayor (2020–2026): Thierry Dupuis
- Area^{1}: 15.38 km^{2} (5.94 sq mi)
- Highest elevation: 152 m (499 ft)
- Lowest elevation: 120 m (390 ft)
- Population (2023): 960
  - Density: 62/km^{2} (160/sq mi)
- Time zone: UTC+01:00 (CET)
  - Summer (DST): UTC+02:00 (CEST)
- INSEE/Postal code: 45026 /45210
- ^{1} French Land Register data, which excludes lakes, ponds, glaciers > 1 km^{2} (0.386 sq mi or 247 acres) and river estuaries.

Bazoches-sur-le-Betz is a commune in the Loiret department in north-central France.

== Population ==
Historical population
Year	Pop.	±% p.a.
1968	222	—
1975	219	−0.19%
1982	285	+3.83%
1990	518	+7.75%
1999	671	+2.92%
2007	839	+2.83%
2012	980	+3.16%
2017	946	−0.70%
2023	960	+0.25%
Source: INSEE

== See also ==
- Communes of the Loiret department
