= Pointe des Galets =

Headland in the French overseas department of Réunion

Coordinates: 20°55′45″S 55°17′25″E

The Pointe des Galets is a cape in the northwest of the island of Réunion, heading on the Indian Ocean. It is now entirely occupied by the town centre of Le Port.

As of June 2020, construction work is ongoing at the site to accommodate the installation of a shore-end for the METISS cable.
