= Immaculate Conception College, Mananjary =

- French: Collège Immaculée Conceptio

Location
- Mananjary, Fianarantsoa; Madagascar
- Coordinates: 21°14′17″S 48°20′40″E

Information
- Type: Private Catholic primary and secondary education institution
- Religious affiliation: Roman Catholic (Jesuits)
- Established: 1955; 71 years ago
- Grades: K-12
- Gender: Coeducational
- Enrollment: 1,250

The Immaculate Conception College, Mananjary, is a private Catholic primary and secondary school located in Mananjary, Fianarantsoa, Madagascar. The school was founded by the Jesuits in 1955 as a diocesan school, and was run by the Brothers of Christian Doctrine from France from 1957 to 1986. In 1986 it again became a diocesan school, with Jesuits helping, and since 2004 the Jesuits assumed full control of the school.

== History ==
Collège Immaculée Conception was founded in 1955 as a diocesan school by a Jesuit priest. In 1957, the Brothers of Christian Doctrine took over the school.

While under colonial rule all teaching was done in French and Malagasy was taught only as a secondary language, for all primary school classes. Technical school, in wood and metalwork, and agricultural education were undertaken. But health problems from the humid coastal climate forced most of the brothers to leave the school by 1986.

When the Brothers left in 1986 the school returned to the diocese. The bishop at the time asked the Jesuits to help out with the school. It remained diocesan but entrusted to the Jesuits until 2004 when it became the third secondary school in the Jesuit Province of Madagascar.

== See also ==
- Catholic Church in Madagascar
- Education in Madagascar
- List of Jesuit schools
