= Keelonga =

- Founded: 2007
- Founders: Karim Pirbay
- Purpose: Education
- Location: Antananarivo

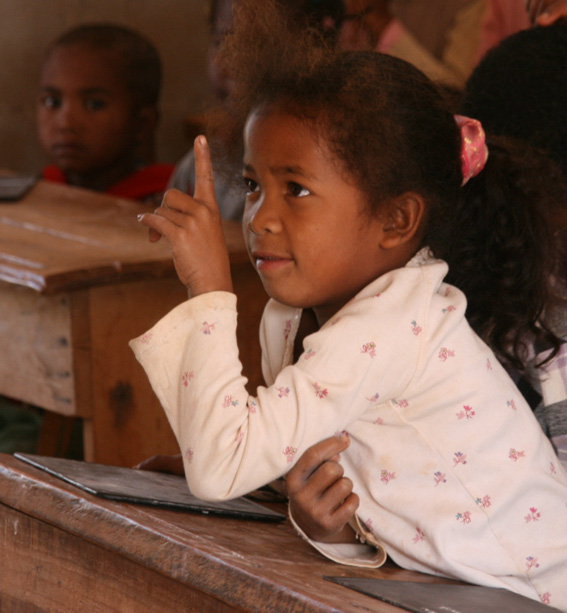
1st grade student at Soamanandray

Keelonga is an initiative started by Leila and Karim Pirbay in 2007. "Kilonga" means children in Malagasy, the language of Madagascar.

The goal of Keelonga is to make it easy for every child to get an elementary education in all rural areas in Madagascar.

To achieve this, Keelonga identifies and selects public elementary schools located in rural areas that are in obvious need of infrastructure repair and maintenance and/or with insufficient number of teachers. After discussing with the administration of the school and the students’ parents, an action plan is set.

Keelonga currently operates in rural areas around Antananarivo, the capital city. It has already successfully done heavy repairs in many schools. A few water wells have been dug in these schools to provide water and increase the awareness of children for hygiene.

Keelonga also provides teachers whenever necessary in order to maintain a ratio of students to teachers 50 to 1.

Actions for the future include more water wells, continue repair and maintenance work and start introducing some courses which are not available such as computer skills.
