= Andrianjaka Razakatsitakatrandriana =

King of Imerina
- Reign: c. 1670–1675
- Predecessor: Andriantsimitoviaminandriandehibe
- Successor: Andriamasinavalona
- Born: Analamanga
- Died: 1675; Ankadimbahoaka
- Spouse: Ravololontsimitovy, Rafoloarivo
- Issue: Four sons and six daughters
- Dynasty: Hova dynasty
- Father: Andriantsimitoviaminandriandehibe
- Mother: Ramahafoloarivo

Andrianjaka Razakatsitakatrandriana or Andrianjakatsitakatrandriana was the King of Imerina in the central Highlands of Madagascar from 1670–1675. He was born in Analamanga as Lamboritakatra, eldest son of King Andriantsimitoviaminandriandehibe. During his father's lifetime, Andrianjakatsitakatrandriana was granted Antananarivo and the land west of it, including Ambohidrabiby, Ambohimanga and regions in the north, as his fief. Although his younger brother, Andrianjakanavalondambo, demonstrated a stronger capacity for wise leadership, Andrianjakatsitakatrandriana was selected to succeed upon the death of their father in 1670. Andriantsimitoviaminandriandehibe took this decision on the basis of the tradition established by their Vazimba ancestors Rafohy and Rangita, who declared that the elder must rule before the younger. In 1675 Andriamampandry and the nobles of Imerina deposed him in favor of his younger brother.

== Reign ==
Andrianjakatsitakatrandriana married twice during his life: first, Ravololontsimitovy of the Andriantsimitoviaminandriandehibe clan, and second, Rafoloarivo of the Andriamanjakatokana clan. He had four sons and six daughters. His younger brother, Andrianjakanavalondambo, lived in Alasora during Andrianjakatsitakatrandriana's reign.

As king, Andrianjakatsitakatrandriana soon showed himself to be stubborn and lacking in common sense. Several years into his rule, popular dissatisfaction was widespread. A widely respected political adviser and elder of the noble class named Andriamampandry took it upon himself to examine both brothers and rally the people to support a change in leadership. Andriamampandry visited the king and requested something to eat, but Andrianjakatsitakatrandriana claimed not to have anything available to share on that day. Before leaving, Andriamampandry asked the king, "How many hearts do you have?", to which the king replied that he had only one heart. Andriamampandry then visited prince Andrianjakanavalondambo, who acknowledged that it should normally be the king's right to enjoy the honor of showing hospitality to Andriamampandry, but offered to share his meal with the elder nonetheless. Afterward, Andriamampandry asked the prince how many hearts he had, to which the prince replied that he had two.

Three versions of the events that followed Andriamampandry's initial assessment of the two brothers were recorded in the mid-19th century Tantara ny Andriana eto Madagasikara, the first documenting of Merina oral history. In the first version, Andriamampandry rallied the public in a speech that retold his experience with the brothers and explained in figurative terms the selfishness of men with one heart and the generosity and empathy of men with two hearts. Andriamampandry then left the gathering and was halfway to the royal palace when he was stopped by a man named Andriamanalina who offered to express the people's concerns to the king. The two traveled to the palace and Andriamanalina requested an audience. When an attendant asked his reason for wishing to see the king, Andriamanalina responded with a lengthy condemnation and then departed. Afterward the king discussed Andriamanalina's diatribe with Andriamampandry, who explained that the people were dissatisfied with him and advised him to leave the palace. The king departed, and at the same time the prince left Alasora to travel to his brother's palace.

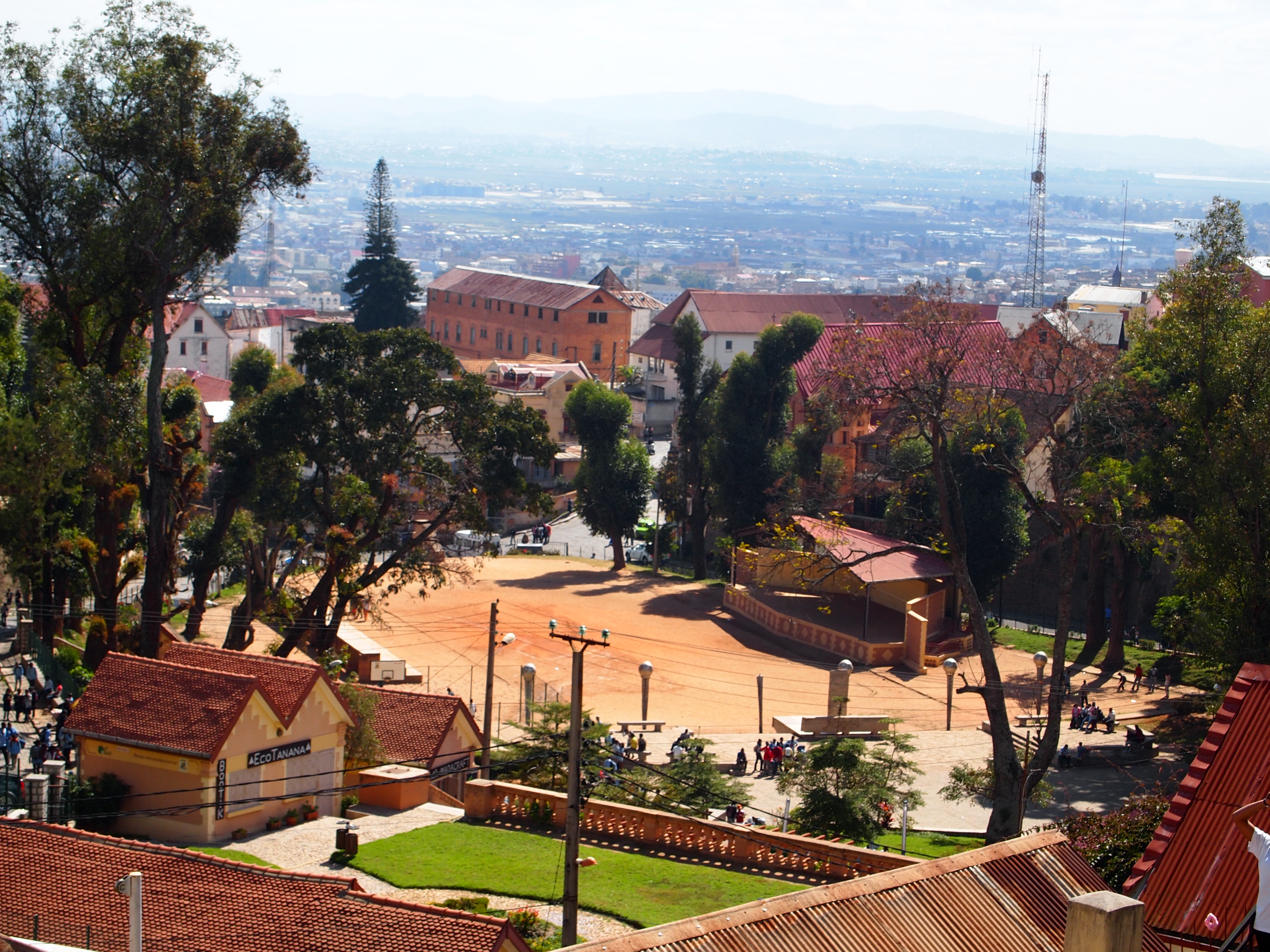
The king's advisor burned down the village at Andohalo, which his successor transformed into a public square.

The first version of the story relates that during the king's absence Andriamampandry burned down the village at Andohalo, just outside the palace walls. The king returned having been universally lambasted, to find Andohalo burned and his younger brother occupying the palace under a new name - Andriamasinavalona - given to him by Andriamampandry. Andrianjakatsitakatrandriana fled to the coastal Sakalava Kingdom, where he enticed a number of Sakalava soldiers to fight with him to retake the palace. The soldiers had not expected such a long journey, however, and abandoned Andrianjakatsitakatrandriana before reaching the highlands. Defeated, Andrianjakatsitakatrandriana returned to the capital and offered his submission to his younger brother. Andriamasinavalona sent him to live out his days in the village of Ankadimbahoaka.

The variations on this narrative are fundamentally similar. A second version recounts that the prince described himself as having "three hearts, two hearts, and one heart" (rather than just two hearts), and explains that Andriamampandry tricked the king into leaving the palace by instructing him to journey to a distant location to sacrifice a zebu to the ancestors. In the third version, a primary role is given to the sampy (royal idol) named Kelimalaza, to which the success of Andriamasinavalona's coup is attributed.

== Death ==
Andrianjakatsitakatrandriana died in Ankadimbahoaka and was buried in Ambohimanatrika. The former site of the burned village at Andohalo was renamed Ambohimanoro ("Burned Hill") and the site was forbidden to all future sovereigns of Imerina.

== Bibliography ==
- Callet, François (1972) [1908]. Tantara ny andriana eto Madagasikara (histoire des rois) (in French). Antananarivo: Imprimerie catholique.
- Rasamuel, David (2007). Fanongoavana: une capitale princière malgache du XIVe siècle. Antananarivo: Arguments. ISBN 978-2-7592-0066-5.
