= Andriantsimitoviaminandriandehibe =

King of Imerina
- Reign: c. 1650–1670
- Predecessor: Andriantsitakatrandriana
- Successor: Razakatsitakatrandriana
- Born: Rova of Antananarivo
- Died: c. 1670 C.E
- Burial: Rova of Antananarivo
- Spouse: Ratompoimbahoaka, Ramahafoloarivo, Rafaravavy Rampanananiamboninitany
- Issue: Four sons (Razakatsitakatrandriana, Andriandambomanafika, Andrianjakanavalondambo, Andriamanitrinitany) and three daughters (Ravololondrenitrimo, Ranavolontsimitoviaminandriana-dRalambo I, Ranavalonmanambonitany)
- Dynasty: Hova dynasty
- Father: Andriantsitakatrandriana
- Mother: Ravololontsimitovy

Andriantsimitoviaminandriandehibe ("the noble without equal among great nobles") was the King of Imerina in the central highlands of Madagascar from 1650 to 1670. He acceded to the throne on the death of his father, King Andriantsitakatrandriana. He had three wives: Ratompoimbahoaka of Ambohimalaza, Princess Ramahafoloarivo (granddaughter of King Andrianjaka), and Princess Rafaravavy Rampanananiamboninitany. He is responsible for establishing the rice paddies of the Betsimitatatra that lie to the west of Ankadimbahoaka.

== Reign ==
Andriantsimitoviaminandriandehibe pledged to continue his father's work to transform the Bestimitatatra swamps into rice paddies to feed the growing population of Imerina. He selected two of his sons to oversee the labor. The two princes challenged one another to see who could complete their dike fastest. The king proceeded to traditionally divide the territory into northern and southern halves along the Ikopa River and assigned Andrianjakanavalondambo to construct a southern dike at Ambivy, while his eldest son and heir apparent, Razakatsitakatrandriana, was tasked with building a northern dike from Ankadimbahovaka to Anosizato. The king positioned himself at Ankadimbahovaka where he could observe the work of the entire population and both his sons' qualities of governance as they oversaw the construction of the dikes. The younger of the two boys, Andrianjakanavalondambo, was the first to complete the construction of his dike. The young prince visited his father en route to brag to his elder brother, whereupon the king warned him, "Younger as you are, learn to wait until the end. Stay where you belong and don't bring troubles upon yourself without reason, as you are a man, my friend."

His eldest son, Andrianjaka Razakatsitakatrandriana, was declared heir apparent and ruler of Antananarivo, Ambohidrabiby and Ambohimanga. Andrianjakanavalondambo heeded his father's advice to wait for his moment to come, and accepted the responsibility of governing the illustrious territory of Alasora, as well as Ambohimanjaka, Antanamalaza, Ifandana, Ambohimanambola and Andrianakotrina. After Andriantsimitoviaminandriandehibe's death, Andrianjakanavalondambo would go on to supplant his older brother as the celebrated sovereign Andriamasinavalona. Andriantsimitoviaminandriandehibe's two younger sons, Andriandambomanafika and Andriamanitrinitany, co-ruled Ambohimanga and governed Ambohipoloalina, respectively.

== Death ==
Andriantsimitoviaminandriandehibe died at the Rova of Antananarivo in 1670. He was succeeded by his eldest son, Andrianjaka Razakatsitakatrandriana.

== Bibliography ==
- Callet, François (1972) [1908]. Tantara ny andriana eto Madagasikara (histoire des rois) (in French). Antananarivo: Imprimerie catholique.
