= Andriantsitakatrandriana =

King of Imerina
- Reign: c. 1630–1650
- Predecessor: Andrianjaka
- Successor: Andriantsimitoviaminandriandehibe
- Born: 1613; Analamanga
- Died: c. 1650 (aged around 37); Antananarivo
- Burial: Fitomiandalana, Rova of Antananarivo
- Spouse: Ravololontsimitovy, Rafoloarivo
- Issue: Two sons (Andriantsimitoviaminandriandehibe, Andriamanjakatokana)
- Dynasty: Hova dynasty
- Father: Andrianjaka
- Mother: Ravadifo

Andriantsitakatrandriana (1613-c. 1650) was the king of Imerina from 1630 to 1650, acceding to the throne upon the death of his father, Andrianjaka. He took two wives: the first, Ravololontsimitovy, gave birth to his first son and successor Andriantsimitoviaminandriandehibe, while his second wife, Rafoloarivo, gave birth to a son named Andriamanjakatokana. During his reign, he chased his second wife and son from his territory, and constructed dikes to transform the Betsimitatatra swamps around Antananarivo into vast rice paddies to feed the local population.

== Reign ==
The chief accomplishment of Andriantsitakatrandriana's reign was the initial transformation of the vast Betsimitatatra swamps surrounding the hill of Analamanga into fertile rice paddies through the construction of dikes. Until his time, only zozoro (an indigenous sedge), rushes, and clusters of trees grew in the marshy lands around the capital city of Antananarivo, which his father had at last wrested from its Vazimba occupants several decades before. After clear-cutting the marshes, Andriantsitakatrandriana ordered the construction of a dike at the southern end of the swamp near Andriantany. The marshes to the west of Antananarivo were the first to be planted as rice paddies. Successive sovereigns would continue this work and progressively transform the entire Betsimitatatra into a continuous patchwork of rice paddies.

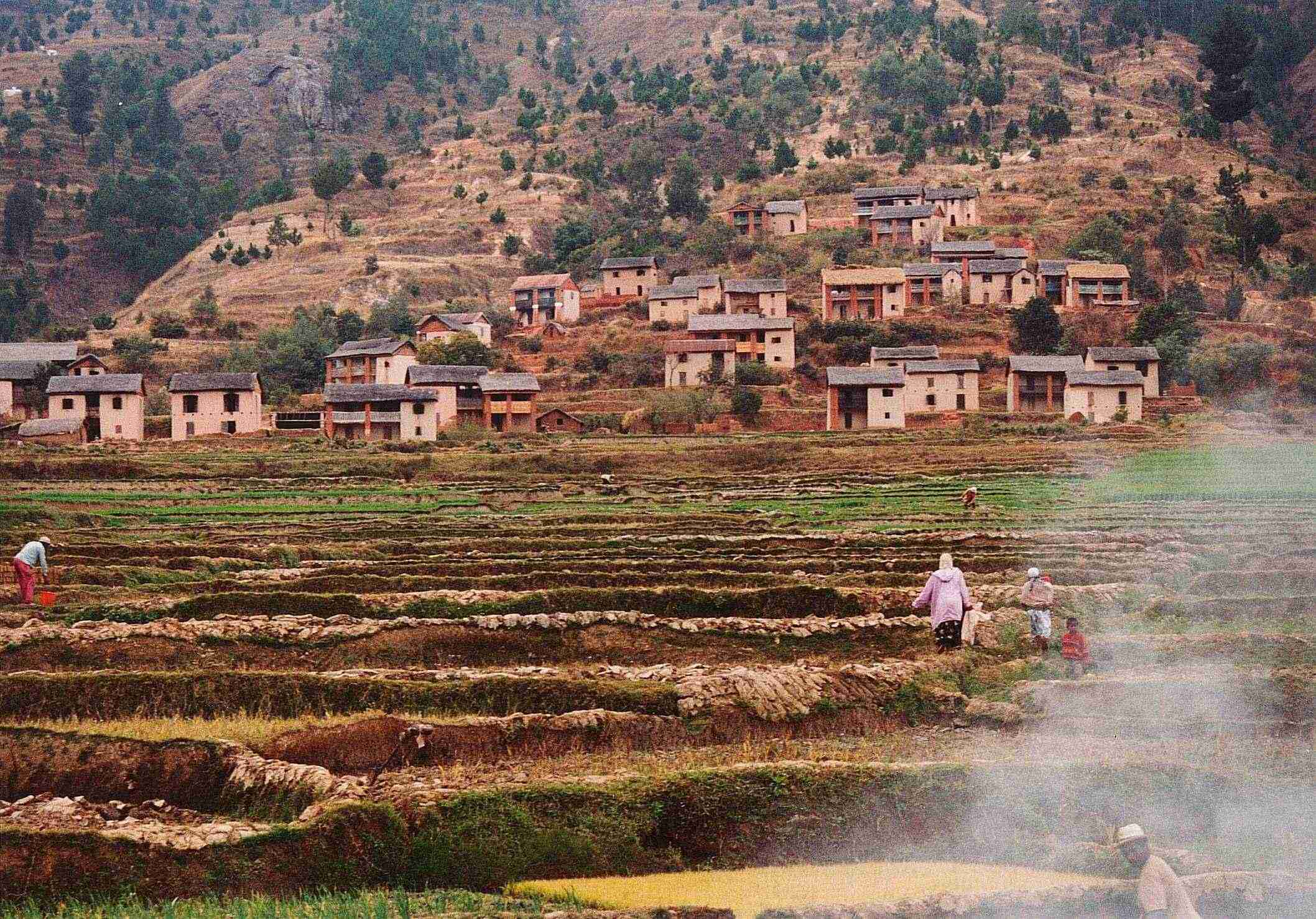
Andriantsitakatrandriana expanded the rice fields around Antananarivo

Oral history relates that Andriantsitakatrandriana devised a ruse to chase his second wife and her son from his territory, although a justification for this uncharitable act is not explicitly stated. According to legend, Andriantsitakatrandriana made an unusual request of his second wife, Rafoloarivo: he asked her to travel to the village of Ambohitrakely to give hasina to her son (i.e. engage in actions that were believed to multiply his metaphysical worth)—an act that a woman was viewed as unfit to enact for the benefit of a royal male. The queen expressed reluctance to transgress this taboo, but her husband assured her that her concerns should be mitigated by his magnanimous intent to likewise transmit hasina to his first son. He declared that he would reward the queen for her obedience by changing the name of his newly constructed rice paddies from his own name to that of her son. Rafoloarivo complied and departed for Ambohitrakely where she organized a celebration that attracted all the inhabitants of the village of Mahatsinjo.

While Mahatsinjo was empty and unguarded, Andriantsitakatrandriana stealthily set fire to the buildings. The distraught populace noticed the blaze and cried out, "Queen, look at this terrible misfortune that has befallen us!" Rafoloarivo and her son escaped the angry crowd and first fled north to Ilafy, then west and south to Mahatsinjo and Ankosy, all without finding a single person willing to open their doors to the pair. Early in the morning they reached Ambohitrinimanjaka where, at last, the people offered them shelter. Her son, sighting a rocky outcropping in the distance that the locals called Anosivato, declared an interest in continuing to the more distant location, but the queen preferred to remain at Amohitrinimanjaka where Andriamanjakatokana is buried. Locals would traditionally visit the tomb to pray to his spirit whenever a heavy fog descended. The tomb of Andriamanjakatokana's son, also named Andriamanjakatokana, can be visited at Anosivato.

== Death ==
Andriantsitakatrandriana died around 1650 and was buried in the Fitomiandalana tombs at the Rova of Antananarivo. He was succeeded by his oldest son, Andriantsimitoviaminandriandehibe.

== Bibliography ==
- Callet, François (1972) [1908]. Tantara ny andriana eto Madagasikara (histoire des rois) (in French). Antananarivo: Imprimerie catholique.
