= Andriamasinavalona =

Imerinan monarch

King of Imerina
- Reign: 1675–1710
- Predecessor: Razakatsitakatrandriana
- Successor: Andriantsimitoviaminiandriana Andriandrazaka
- Born: Alasora
- Died: 1710; Antananarivo
- Burial: Antananarivo
Names
- Andrianjakanavalondralambo / Ralambonandriatsimitovy
- House: Andriana Merina (Descendant of King Ralambo)
- Dynasty: Andriamasinavalona
- Father: Andriantsimitoviaminandriandehibe, King of Antananarivo
- Mother: Rafaravavy

Andriamasinavalona (1675–1710), also known as Andrianjakanavalondambo, was a King of Imerina in the central highlands of Madagascar. He made significant and enduring contributions to the social, political and economic life of Imerina. Chief among these was the expansion of his territories and the pacification and unification of certain principalities that had become locked in violent conflict; Andriamasinavalona established and ruled over the largest extent of the Kingdom of Imerina. He gave the name of Antananarivo to the capital city that was rapidly expanding around the royal palace on the hill of Analamanga, created a large public square at Andohalo outside the gates of the city, and named a series of other locations within the city. He also took possession of a distant hill he renamed Ambohimanga as a lodging for his son Andriantsimitoviaminiandriana; the royal city that developed there has been declared a UNESCO World Heritage Site.

The innovations of Andriamasinavalona were numerous and enduring. He created two additional noble castes and defined their associated rights, responsibilities and restrictions, and was responsible for introducing the tradition of the red parasol as an indicator of royalty; he also decreed that all women had the right to choose their husbands. Trade with the Sakalava kingdom enabled this king to increase the firearms, cannons and gunpowder available for the defense of the kingdom, and expanded the availability of luxury items like silver piastres and porcelain dishes. The dikes around the Betsimitatatra rice fields of Antananarivo were expanded and raised to help ensure against famine.

In the interest of strengthening the defenses of the kingdom, Andriamasinavalona divided his realm into four quadrants to be ruled by his four favorite sons. This decision had the opposite effect, however; each was interested in expanding his own realm, prompting one son to kidnap the king and hold him hostage for seven years. After the king's eventual release, he famously committed a mock human sacrifice to re-sanctify his authority. Upon his death, Andriamasinavalona's sons launched military campaigns against one another to seize each other's territories, triggering 77 years of civil war in Imerina. In Madagascar today, Andriamasinavalona's reign is remembered as a golden age of justice, harmony and prosperity.

King of Imerina

Incumbent
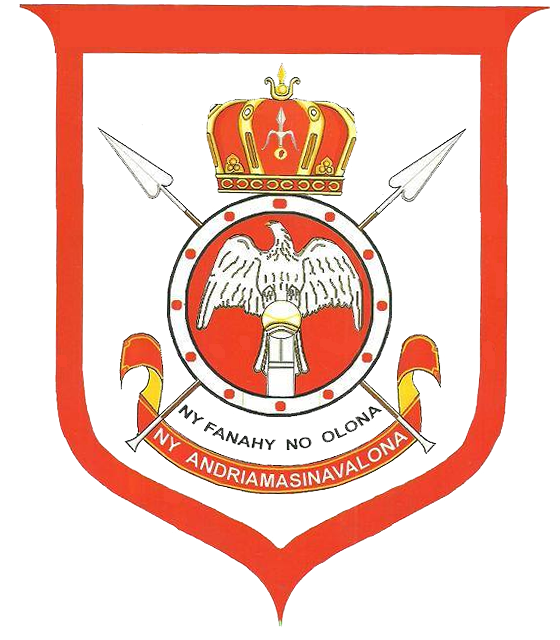
- Andriamasinavalona

== Early life and accession to throne ==
Andriamasinavalona was born Prince Andrianjakanavalondambo in the historic Merina capital of Alasora to his father King Andriantsimitoviaminandriandehibe and mother Rampanambonitany. He was made Prince of Alasora upon his father's death in 1670; his older brother, Andrianjaka Razakatsitakatrandriana, was named king. Andriamasinavalona ascended to the kingship of Imerina upon the deposition of his brother in 1675. The deposed king fled to the Sakalava kingdom to the west and attempted unsuccessfully to secure military support there to regain the throne.

Two enduring royal traditions emerged in Imerina as a consequence of the power struggle between Andriamasinavalona and his older brother. Some versions of oral history describe a combat between their armies at Ambohibato in which Andriamasinavalona emerged victorious. He erected a commemorative stone at the battle site that he named Ankazonorona, designating it the site where newly enthroned kings would stand to receive their first expression of hasina (homage, affirmation of authority) from their subjects. Andriamasinavalona also introduced the practice of gathering his subjects to consult them and obtain their consent before making certain decisions. This practice was continued by subsequent rulers in Imerina.

== Family and descendants ==
Andriamasinavalona married twelve wives and produced nine sons and one daughter. The children of four of his wives would go on to rule their own kingdoms: Ratompoindroandriana gave birth to Andriantsimitoviaminiandriana at Ambohimanga; Ramananandrianjaka gave birth to Andriantomponimerina at Ambohidratrimo; Ramananimerina had her son Andrianjakanavalona at Antananarivo; and Rasolomanambonitany had Andrianavalonimerina near Ambohitrabiby. The children of four other wives would renounce all claims to the throne: Andriamborosy and Rafaralahimanjaka, born to Renilambo in Ambohidrapeto; Andriantsilavo, born to Ranavalona in Anosimanjaka; Andrianavalona, born to Rakalafohy in Isoraka; and Andriankotofananina, born to Reninandriankotofananina in Anosipatrana. The descendants of Andriamasinavalona's wives who renounced claim to the throne were ennobled by him as the royal Andriamasinavalona class. The remaining four marriages (to wives Ralanimboahangy, Raseranolona, Ranavalotomponimerina and Ramanamabahoaka) would not produce children, but one of these wives - Ralanimboahangy - adopted a girl named Andriamanitrinitany. She was housed with her adoptive mother at Ambohipeno and died without producing children of her own, although she likewise adopted a child named Ramasina, who was most likely the son of her sister.

== Reign ==
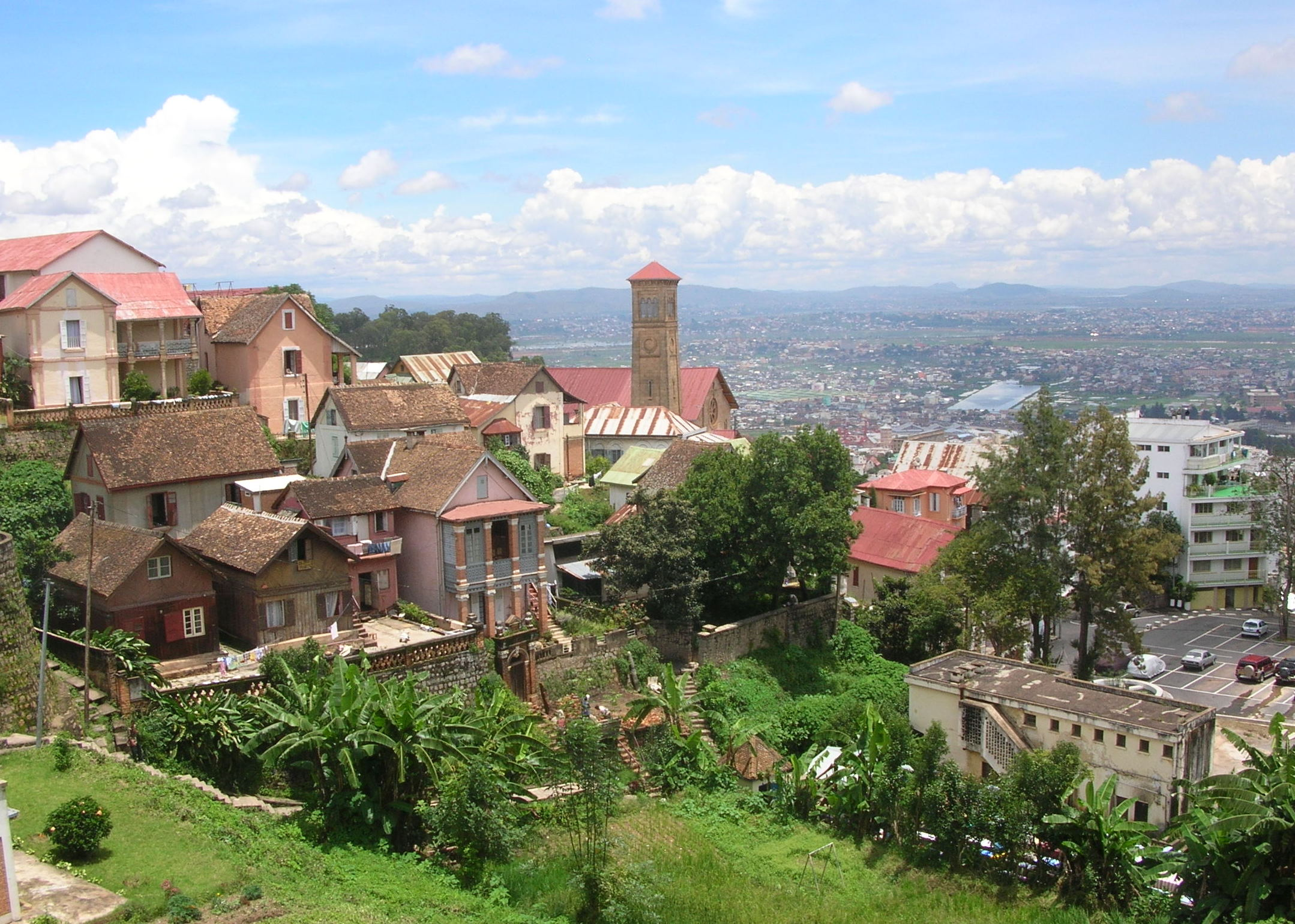
Andriamasinavalona gave the city of Antananarivo its name.

Andriamasinavalona is remembered in Imerina as a king of significant achievements. He is credited with unifying a number of warring principalities in Imerina and expanding the territory of the kingdom to its largest extent. He created the Andohalo town square outside the gate of Antananarivo, where all successive sovereigns delivered their royal speeches and announcements to the public. Andriamasinavalona gave the city - previously called by the name of its hill, Analamanga - its current name of Antananarivo, and assigned the names of numerous locations within the city, based on the names of similar sites in the nearby village of Antananarivokely. During his reign the production of the Betsimitatatra rice fields around Antananarivo was dramatically increased. He also increased the number of guns and quantity of gunpowder in Imerina through trade with neighboring kingdoms, and imported the kingdom's first cannons for its defense. Other innovations included the importation and fabrication of plates made from sea turtle skin. He strengthened the social order by creating two new noble castes, putting in place further restrictions and responsibilities for each, and decreeing the right of every woman to choose her own husband.

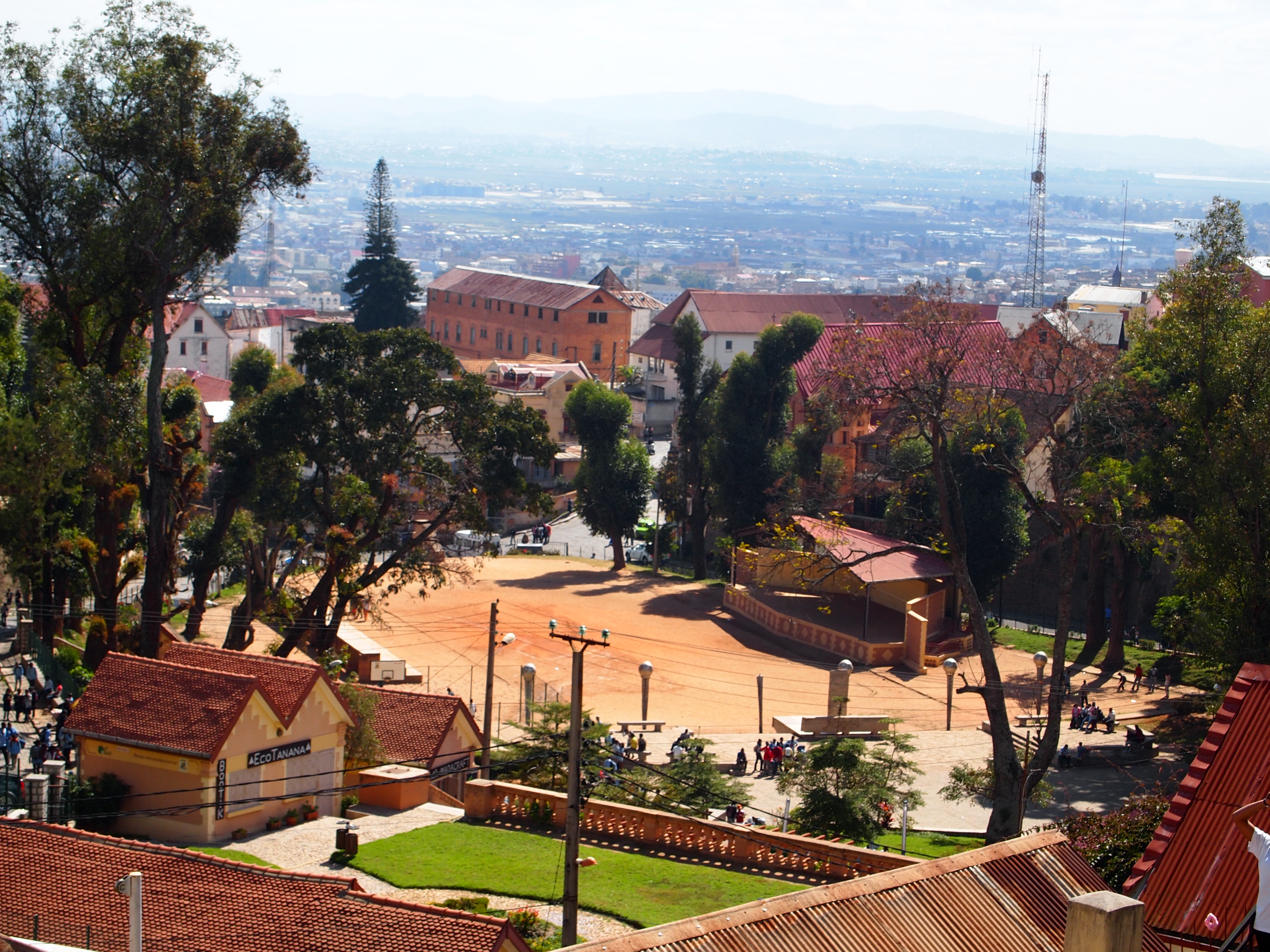
Andohalo, where Merina sovereigns addressed the public

Under Andriamasinavalona's rule, the political administration of Imerina became more clearly defined. The number of andriana (noble) sub-castes was expanded from four to six and additional roles and specific territories were designated for each group, both within the neighborhoods of Antananarivo and in the countryside surrounding the capital. These territorial divisions were strictly enforced: members of sub-castes were required to live within their designated territories and were not authorized to stay for extended periods in the territories reserved for others. Andriamasinavalona decentralized governance and strengthened the power of local administrators by creating a series of new decrees that further formalized the relationship between the andriana and the hova (commoners) they ruled.

The king's reign was marked by a drought lasting seven years that caused a famine in much of Imerina. According to oral history, the king attempted to purchase rice from his fief at Ambohipiainana. The town had a surplus but the local leader refused to sell rice to Andriamasinavalona, claiming none was available. The king then sent porters to purchase rice from Antsahatovoka, where the residents declared that while the land was his and it was thus unnecessary for the king to purchase what already belonged to him, there was no rice available to share. Finally, Andriamasinavalona sought to purchase rice in Andraisisa. His money was refused by the local leader, Andriandrivotra, who willingly gave the king large shares of food and a tribute of silver. To reward the leader of the fief, Andriamasinavalona promised to give him anything he liked. Andriandrivotra declared that all he desired was the love of his sovereign. To show his appreciation, Andriamasinavalona declared that he would make Andraisisa into a great fief, and gave Andriandrivotra a large piece of land to the west of the territory. He then undertook a major expansion of the Betsimitatatra rice fields around Antananarivo, significantly increasing their rice production to feed the populace.

=== Sociopolitical restructuring ===
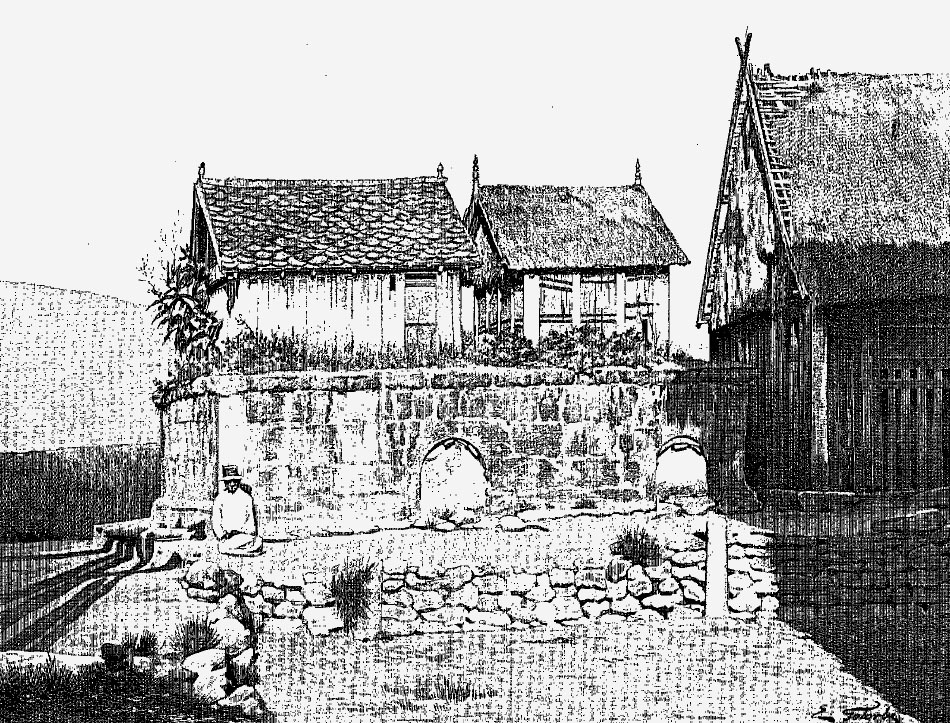
The right to tranomasina on the tombs of nobles was extended to new andriana sub-castes created by Andriamasinavalona.

Andriamasinavalona's reorganization and refinement of the subdivisions of the noble class took into account the precedents set by earlier Merina kings Andrianjaka and Ralambo. He declared that only members of the Zazamarolahy ("Numerous Children") caste, composed of nobles descended from Andrianjaka's children, could be shaded by the red parasol of royalty; the tradition of the royal parasol was introduced to Imerina during Andriamasinavalona's reign and persisted until the dissolution of the monarchy in 1897. He also decreed that their tombs should be topped with a tranomasina, a small wooden house without windows or hearth and containing their worldly riches, where their spirit could return to visit after death. Unlike other noble sub-castes, the Zazamarolahy were not constrained to inhabit a particular neighborhood, as Andriamasinavalona acknowledged the privilege of future sovereigns to determine the proximity of these most influential nobles according to the particularities of changing circumstances. Andriamasinavalona also narrowed the pool of potential future sovereigns by restricting this right to a new sub-group within the Zazamarolahy, which he termed Zanak'andriana ("Children of the Sovereign"). This group comprised all the descendants of the royal wives who had given birth to the king's four designated heirs. New rulers could only be selected from among this new sub-class of nobles.

The four wives of King Andriamasinavalona whose children were not chosen to rule one of the four districts of Imerina were assigned the noble sub-caste of "Andriamasinavalona" and transferred this ranking to their descendants. The king declared that members of this sub-caste would inhabit Ambatobevanja, at the southern limit of the neighborhood of Andohalo in Antananarivo, just outside the walls of the royal palace. Although not authorized to rule the kingdom, the Andriamasinavalona were deemed societal elders and gained the right to become "masters of the fief" (tompo-menakely) and construct tranomasina on their tombs. They were also assigned the honor of burying deceased sovereigns and carrying out sacrifices requested by the king. Outside of Antananarivo, the Zazamarolahy and the Andriamasinavalona settled throughout Imerina in the individual fiefs centered around the hill towns that they governed. In this way, nobles always lived in close proximity to the people they ruled, ensured their defense and provided for their livelihood.

Andriamasinavalona established new rules to strengthen the authority of the tompo-menakely over their subjects. Inhabitants of the fief paid taxes (isam-pangady) to the local lord, and offered him the hindquarters of all slaughtered zebu as tribute. Parents who adopted or disowned a child paid a fee of one silver piastre to the lord, and the property of those who died without children would revert to the king, who would share it with him. The inhabitants of a fief were bound to execute any work or task ordered by the tompo-menakely. The authority of the lord was highly independent and interference of the king was infrequent, in part due to the close kinship ties uniting the king to the Zazamarolahy and Andriamasinavalona sub-castes.

The Zana-tompo (or Andriantompokoindrindra) were also considered elders, and Andriamasinavalona decreed that kings would henceforth select their wives and royal food tasters from among this caste. The rites pertaining to circumcision were another honor reserved for the Zana-tompo. The king decreed that they should inhabit the countryside south of the capital extending from Ambavahadimitafo southward to Ambatolampy. Outside of Antananarivo, the Zana-tompo lived in the village of Ambohimalaza.

The Andrianamboninolona (or Zanakambony), Andriandranando (or Zafinandriandranando) and Zanadralambo were considered junior nobles. They were excluded from most of the rules imposed on other noble castes and exempted from fanampoana (forced labor in lieu of monetary tax payment). Instead, they were made responsible for maintaining a key dike that supported irrigation of the capital's rice paddies, producing the silk used to make the king's clothing, and conscripting soldiers for the king's army. They were also responsible for gathering used hoes for the royal blacksmiths to melt down and then supervise the artisans as the metal was crafted into nails, shackles and other forged objects.

Within Antananarivo, the territory of the Andrianamboninolona, designated generations before by King Andrianjaka, included the neighborhood of Ambatomasina (east of Andohalo) and extended from Ambohitantely eastward to Ambatolampy and north to the principal road that led to Ambavahadimasina. The neighborhoods reserved in Antananarivo for the Andriandranando, also decreed by Andrianjaka, laid to the northeast of Andohalo and extended from Ambavahadimasina in the west to Ambohimanoro in the east, and from the road to Ambavahadimasina northward to Ambatonandriankoto. King Andriamasinavalona decreed that within the capital city, the Zanaralambo would live in the area delimited by Ambohitsoa to the southwest, Ambodivoanonoka to the east, and Andohalokely in the north. Outside the capital, each group had its designated villages. The Andrianamboninolona lived in Ambohitromby, Fieferana, Ambohipiainana and Ambohitriniandriana. The Andriandranando lived in Ambohibe, Ambohimailala, Manankasina, Soamanandrariny, Betsizaraina, Iadiambola, Masinandriana, Ampomanjaka and Akadindramamy. Finally, the Zanaralambo inhabited Lazaina, Ambatofotsy and Masindray.

In addition to these new roles for noble sub-castes, Andriamasinavalona singled out the Antehiroka as sacred royal advisers and custodians of ancestral traditions related to circumcision. This clan was formed of the descendants of Andriampirokana and his two sons, themselves descendants of a vazimba king. Andriampirokana befriended King Ralambo and played an integral part in establishing the tradition of circumcision in Imerina. The collection of water gourds and arranging of freshly woven mats for use in the ceremony were made the responsibility of this clan. The Antehiroka were also tasked with delivering royal benedictions, receiving hasina (tribute) on behalf of the king, and wrapping deceased sovereigns in the traditional lambamena shroud. In Antananarivo, the Antehiroka were placed in Ampamaho, the location of their clan tomb. In the countryside, Andriamasinavalona decreed that they should inhabit Ambohitrinimanga and Amboditsiry.

=== Expansion of realm ===
At the time of Andriamasinavalona's reign, the highlands around Imerina were wracked with violent conflict among minor princedoms centered around fortified hill towns. Andriamasinavalona successfully united a number of these principalities in the territory bordering his own, thereby expanding the boundaries of Imerina to include Fanongoavana to the west, Rangaina to the north, Ombifotsy to the east and Sahasarotra to the south. As he brought each territory under his control, he restricted the autonomy of its original rulers and imposed strict submission to his own authority. His diplomatic and political conquests enabled Andriamasinavalona to extend his kingdom to its fullest historical extent, making him the first Merina sovereign to rule over the entire province of Imerina.

The first of these four territories to be incorporated into Imerina was Fanongoavana, then a principality ruled by Andriampanarivofomanjaka. Continual threats to his kingdom's security led Andriampanarivofomanjaka to secretly travel to the Rova of Antananarivo to pledge submission to Andriamasinavalona. He was accompanied by seven advisers who eloquently communicated their master's willingness to acknowledge Andriamasinavalona as his king. Andriamasinavalona accepted this offer and sealed the union of their territories by marrying Andriampanarivofomanjaka to his sister, Ranavalontsimitovy. Andriampanarivofomanjaka then returned to his realm, announced the union to his people, and then spoke with the leaders of the neighboring Bezanozano people to successfully persuade them to join the kingdom and benefit from Andriamasinavalona's protection.

The territory of Ombifotsy was ruled by Andriambahoakafovoanitany, who had a friendly relationship with Andriamasinavalona. The two agreed to a challenge: each would leave his palace simultaneously on a chosen Friday night, and walk toward the other's palace until the two met. They crossed paths at the Ombifotsy ("White Zebu") river, so named because the two sacrificed a white zebu there in honor of their friendship and the peace agreement between their two territories of Imamo and Imerina. Andriambahoakafovoanitany's son dug a trench along the river, where he erected a stone to commemorate the agreement. Imamo was divided into four parts, each administered by one of Andriambahoakafovoanitany's sons.

In addition, Andriamasinavalona is credited with founding Ambohimanga, a site of spiritual and historical significance that was designated a UNESCO World Heritage Site in 2001. Oral history recounts that Andriamasinavalona first remarked a distant hill named Ambohitrakanga when he noticed a bonfire lit on its southern face 24 kilometers away from his rova at Antananarivo; the visibility of the site from his capital led Andriamasinavalona to desire the hill as a residence for his son, Andriantsimitoviaminiandriana. Andriamasinavalona gave the hill its current name, and when he divided the Kingdom of Imerina into four quadrants in 1710, he gave the eastern quadrant of Avaradrano to Andriantsimitoviaminiandriana, who transformed his rova at Ambohimanga into its capital.

=== Division of Imerina ===
The greatest point of controversy in Andriamasinavalona's reign was his decision to divide his kingdom among his four favorite sons: Andrianjakanavalonamandimby, Adrianmanotronavalonimerina, Andriantomponimerina I and Andriantsimitoviaminiandriana, who received the largest share of the land and was the most powerful of the four young sovereigns. Andriamasinavalona furthermore declared that his nephew Andriambonimena, his sister's son, would replace his own sons and succeed him as king after his death to rule all of Imerina as a united whole. The controversial decision to divide Imerina into four sub-kingdoms may have been rooted in the desire to reorganize the kingdom in accordance with traditional notions of symbolic unity as represented by the four cardinal points surrounding a unifying center termed the "heart of Imerina" (Imerina efa-toko). Andriamasinavalona believed the kingdom would be better defended by four brothers than by one alone, and that they could support one another in warding off attackers from the outside.

According to oral history, Andriamasinavalona asked the guardian of Matsatso, one of the three most prominent royal idols, to ask the idol which of his sons should rule after him. The guardian hesitated to declare the idol's choice, but after the king promised no ill reaction to the decision, the man declared the successor to be Andrianavalonimerina. However, the king had hoped that the successor would be another son, Andriantsimitoviaminiandriana. He decided to test the prophecy by sending one of his wives to the guardian's house, where the population showed her respect by offering zebu for her to eat. The zebu cooked inconsistently, and the king interpreted this as a sign that the guardian was dishonest and intended to seize power himself, so Andriamasinavalona ordered him put to death and had the idol Matsatso discarded in a lake. He then asked the guardians of the two other idols (Kelimalaza and Soratra) to declare a successor; the guardian of Soratra fled, while the guardian of Kelimalaza stated that only the king could choose his successor.

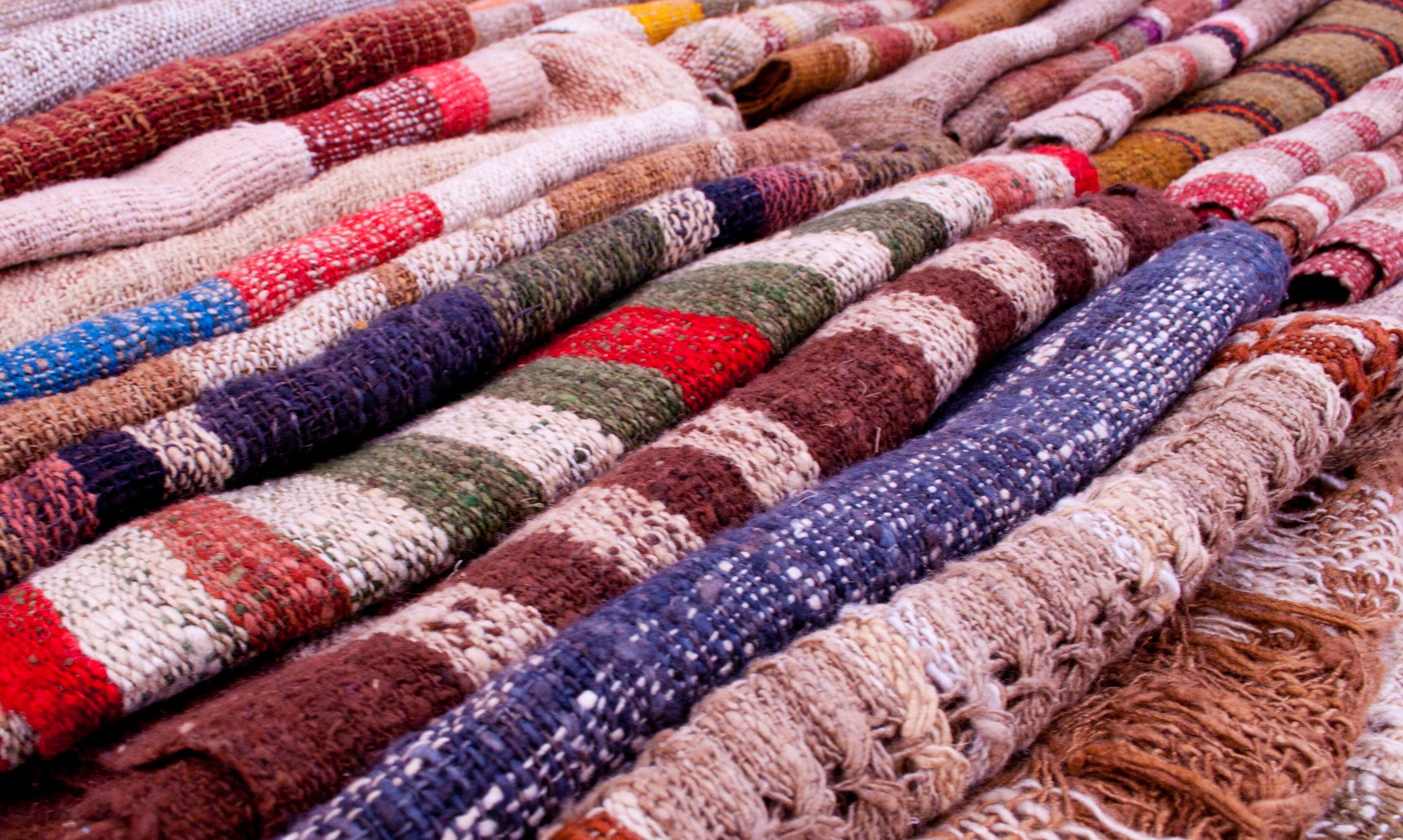
Andriamampandry, adviser to Andriamasinavalona, tore his lamba to illustrate the harmful consequences of dividing Imerina.

Oral history relates that Andriamasinavalona then gathered the people at Andohalo to announce his decision. He requested the presence of his respected adviser and elder, Andriamampandry, who rebuffed the messenger by stating "I have no lamba." The king sent him a lamba to wear, and the elder sent it back with the four corners torn off. The king again returned the lamba, and this time the elder trampled it in the mud. Nonetheless, Andriamampandry dressed in the lamba, declaring "What's been torn can be mended, and what's been dirtied can be cleaned," then attended the king's kabary. There, the king declared that he would divide his kingdom into four parts, each one a fief to be inhabited by his four favorite sons, who would participate in royal decision-making without being made kings themselves. The two northern principalities had their capitals at Ambohimanga and Ambohidrabiby, while the capital of the western principality was located at Ambohidratrimo. The southern principality was ruled from Antananarivo by Andriantomponimerina.

Andriamampandry tried on several occasions to warn Andriamasinavalona of the danger of administering the kingdom in this way. In one instance, he placed a hen in the middle of a room, then set one red rooster free in each corner. The roosters attacked one another viciously, leaving the king speechless. On another day, the elder brought four eagles to the king in a basket. When the basket was opened, the eagles flew wildly about the room, creating havoc. Andriamampandry warned the king that his realm would be no better off once his four sons got a taste of power. Andriamasinavalona recognized the danger but could not bear to choose which among his sons should be excluded from having a part in the decision-making responsibilities of the kingdom, so ignored the elder's advice. Finally Andriamampandry decided to give the king a very explicit warning. Andriamasinavalona had gathered his people in Andohalo to give a speech, when Andriamampandry set a bull loose into the crowd. In the panic that ensued, numerous people were gored or trampled to death, several pregnant women miscarried, and the gathering dispersed in chaos. The king demanded to know who had loosed the bull so that he may be executed, but when Andriamampandry took responsibility he warned the king that yet more blood would be spilled before the earth would be quenched. He then criticized the king for his concern over the relatively few deaths at the gathering, in light of the number of people who would die as a consequence of his division of Imerina. He further predicted that the prince at Ambohimanga would unite Imerina and lead it back to greatness. Andriamasinavalona reportedly had no response to give Andriamampandry, but instead hung his head in shame.

The 19th century transcription of Merina oral history, Tantara ny Andriana eto Madagasikara, relates that Andriamampandry privately assessed the leadership qualities of each of the four selected sons, with disappointing results. He presented Andriambonimena of Alasora with a beautiful parrot, which the prince killed and served as food. The elder concluded that he was "a gun that loads itself." The oldest son, Andrianjakanavalonamandimby, was given a pot of honey, which he smashed in order to eat every last drop. Afterward Andriamampandry remarked that the kingdom had become a pot of honey without a lid, implying the first one to come along would be free to reach his hand inside and take all its bounty for himself. He visited Andriantomponimerina at Ambohidratrimo and offered him a zebu kidney (considered unpalatable), which the prince ordered to be prepared as a meal nonetheless, leading the elder to remark, "This man can't even resist the temptation to eat the kidney." He visited Andrianavalonimerina at Ambohitrabiby carrying a lemon and a weaver's stake, which the prince's wife demanded he give to them, demonstrating their greediness. Andriamampandry also visited prince Andriantsimitoviaminiandriana at Ambohimanga, carrying an axe and a rope. The prince asked to borrow the two items, then ordered a servant to use the axe and rope to butcher a zebu, put some of the best meat in a basket, cook the rest of the good meat for their meal, and set aside the neck and the ribbed part of the tripe in a second basket. The elder dined with the prince and spent the night at the village. When Andriamampandry was about to leave, the prince returned the rope and axe, gave him the basket of fine meat for his wife, and gave him the second basket, declaring "These are the parts for the axe (i.e. the neck) and the rope (i.e. the striated omasum)." Andriamampandry was deeply impressed by the hospitality and foresight of the prince. He related these incidents to Andriamasinavalona, who decided to test his sons in turn by calling them together to his house, then observing how they slept on the bed they shared there. Andriantsimitoviaminiandriana had his head highest on the pillow, but Andriamasinavalona failed to understand the significance of this, and Andriamampandry rebuked him, remarking "You are the king, and yet you do not understand?"

=== Imprisonment ===
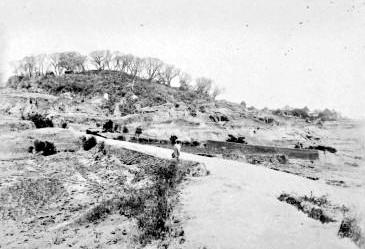
Andriantomponimerina imprisoned Andriamasinavalona at Ambohidratrimo for seven years.

According to oral history, Andriamasinavalona was temporarily usurped through the trickery of his son Andriantomponimerina, who ruled the western territory from his rova at Ambohidratrimo. Once Andriamasinavalona's sons had been installed in their territories, Andriantomponimerina tested his authority by imposing a particular hairstyle upon the Marovatana people he ruled, in disregard of the promise that the king had made to respect the diverse customs and taboos of Imerina. The Marovatana reminded the king of this vow and refused to submit, prompting the king and his sons to prepare for war against the people of the fief. This conflict provided the prince with an opportunity to seize power. Upon the suggestion of the prince's half-brother, Andrianentoarivo, the prince hid himself in a trench he dug into the dirt floor of his royal residence at Ambohidratrimo, then ordered his people to send word to his father that he was "in the ground". Believing his son to be buried alive by the Marovatana as a punitive measure, Andriamasinavalona hurried to Ambohidratrimo carrying reeds as a symbol of peace; upon the king's entrance into the residence, however, Prince Andriantomponimerina locked Andriamasinavalona inside and refused to release him for the next seven years. During this time the prince repeatedly offered to free the king on the condition that Andriamasinavalona accept to transfer power to him, which the king repeatedly refused. Andriantomponimerina prevented his brothers from taking action against him by telling their messengers that the king simply preferred his company and had decided to reside with him at Ambohidratrimo.

After some time, the king's designated successor, Andriambonimena, launched a retaliatory attack against the prince's half-brother Andrianentoarivo at Ambohipotsy and successfully chased him from his fief. Andriantomponimerina recognized the need to take more dramatic action to consolidate his grip on power and sent a messenger to the Sakalava king requesting his support. The Sakalava reaffirmed their loyalty to Andriamasinavalona, however, and threatened to attack the prince if the rightful king was not released from his captivity. According to one version of the oral history, having failed to use the king as a pawn to gain power, the prince decided to ransom his father for 7,000 piastres to increase his personal wealth. Every citizen of Imerina was obligated to contribute, and those who had no money sold their children or themselves into slavery in order to raise the necessary funds. The money was placed in seven baskets and transported by dugout canoe to the prince at Ambohidratrimo, who released the king. According to another version of the story, Prince Andriantsimitoviaminiandriana of Ambohimanga sent two hunters of the Tsimahafotsy clan to free the king by digging an escape passage under the wall of his heavily guarded enclosure. After returning to Antananarivo, Andriamasinavalona sent a messenger who announced that the king had decided to hand power to Andriantomponimerina and invited the prince to the capital to be enthroned. The prince hurried to the palace, and throughout the city he was greeted with cheers, singing and dancing. When Andriamasinavalona received him, however, he publicly condemned the prince and stripped him of his rank and power.

=== Resanctification ===
Two stories exist around a ritual of human sacrifice that Andriamasinavalona conducted after his imprisonment. In one version of the oral history, Andriamampandry and his fellow royal advisers were concerned that the king's imprisonment had weakened his authority and could lead the population to revolt against him. They suggested the king test his people by claiming to be ill and requesting a human sacrifice; if a citizen offered his life for the king, this gesture would indicate the public was still loyal to him. Andriamasinavalona followed this recommendation and gathered the people to request a volunteer who was willing to have his throat slit with a long dagger to sanctify the king. In another version of the story, this proposal was made to sanctify the new Besakana palace that the king ordered rebuilt at the rova in Antananarivo. A man named Trimofoloalina stepped forward to sacrifice his life. In the first version of the story, royal advisers bound him with ropes and laid him on the ground to the west of the Masoandro palace within the rova compound at Antananarivo, but rather than kill the man they symbolically "sacrificed" him by pouring rooster blood mixed with water onto his throat. In the second, he was bound and hoisted to the top of the central pillar of the new building, and his ear was nicked to allow several drops of blood to fall on the top of the pillar to sanctify it. Trimofoloalina was then released and the king asked him to name a reward for his courageous gesture. The man requested that he and his descendants would forever after be exempted from the death penalty for any crime they might commit; Andriamasinavalona agreed to grant this reward.

== Death and legacy ==
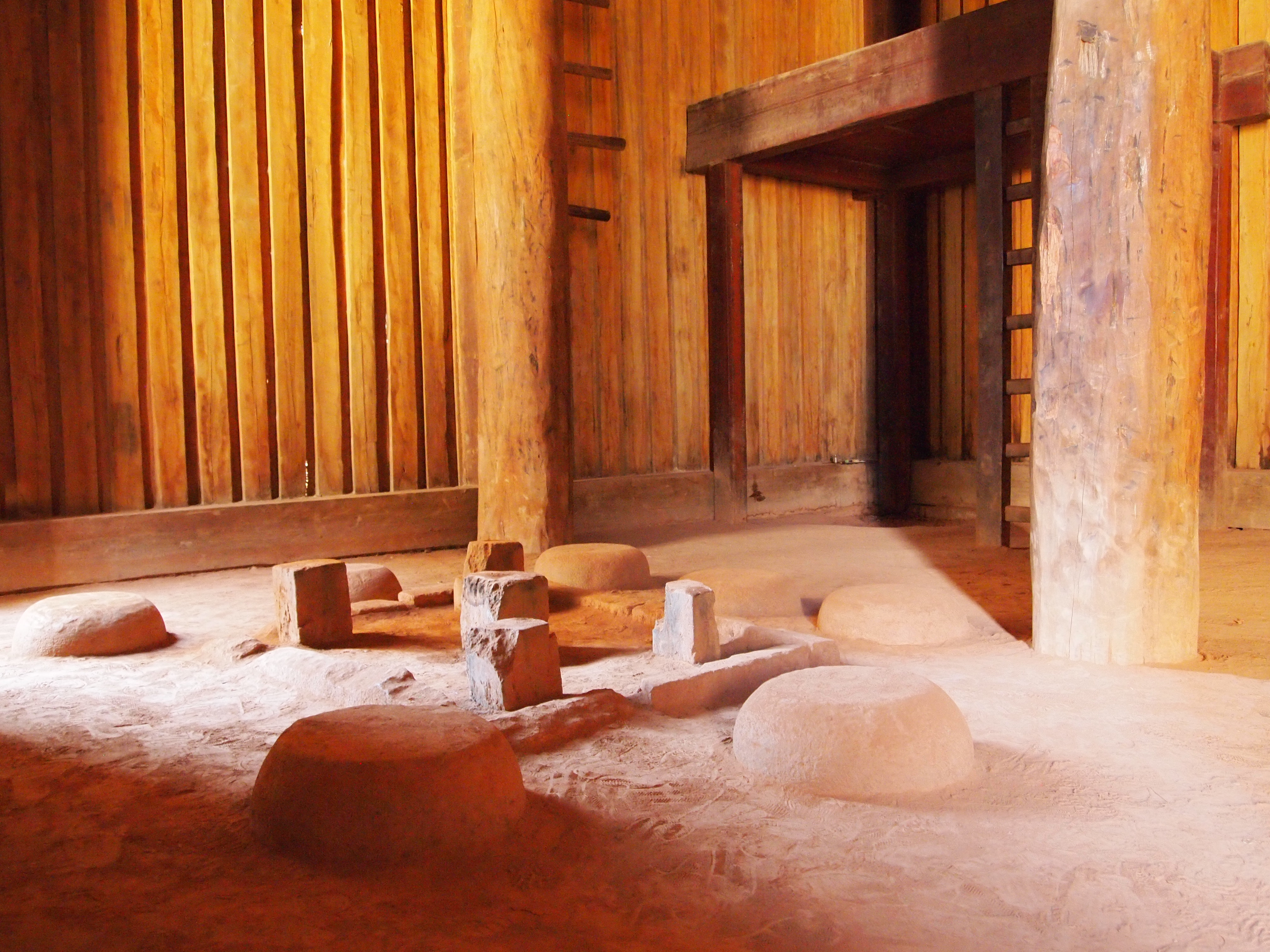
Andriamasinavalona died falling from his elevated bed (right).

Andriamasinavalona died in 1710 when one of his wives, Rasolomananambonitany, inadvertently pushed him from the elevated bed where they slept. He was buried in the royal tombs located at the Rova of Antananarivo. In opposition to Andriamasinavalona's intentions, after the king's death his sons forsook the concept of unity and instead fought one another in an effort to expand their realms. As a consequence of this decision, Imerina fragmented and was wracked with conflict for 77 years, until the kingdom was once again united during the reign of Andrianampoinimerina (1787–1810).

The reign of Andriamasinavalona is remembered in Madagascar as a golden age of prosperity, justice, abundance and harmony. He is described in oral histories as a talented politician and kind and just ruler. His name is often traditionally invoked in Imerina when paying tribute to the ancestors or making a binding pledge. Regarding Andriamasinavalona's legacy, Ellis (1832) remarked, "The character of this chieftain is held in the highest veneration and esteem. He is said to have exercised great care over his district, and to have introduced many important improvements. His memory, laws and customs are still held in the greatest respect, and his name is always mentioned in the public kabarys with a degree of reverence."

== Bibliography ==
- Callet, François (1908). Tantara ny andriana eto Madagasikara (histoire des rois) (in French). Antananarivo: Imprimerie catholique.
- Campbell, Gwyn (2012). David Griffiths and the Missionary "History of Madagascar". Leiden, the Netherlands: Brill. ISBN 978-90-04-20980-0.
- Labourdette, Jean-Paul; Auzias, Dominique (2011). Madagascar (in French). Paris: Petit Futé. ISBN 978-2-7469-4029-1.
- Ogot, Bethwell (1992). Africa from the Sixteenth to the Eighteenth Century. UNESCO. ISBN 978-92-3-101711-7.
- Thomas, Rakotoarivelo (2014). Andriamasinavalona, Mpanjaka tokana teto Imerina (1675 - 1710) (in Malagasy). Antananarivo.
