= Andriamanitrinitany =

Andriamanitrinitany was a member of the Merina dynasty of Madagascar in the 17th century. He was the 4th son of King Andriantsimitoviaminandriandehibe of Imerina. King Andriamasinavalona granted him Ambohipoloalina as his fief.

He had issue one son (Ratrimomiambonilahy), and two daughters (Princess Ravololondrenitrimo and Princess Ranavolontsimitoviaminandriana-dRalambo I of Anosivavaka).
