= Sampy =

Amulet or idol of spiritual significance to the Malagasy people

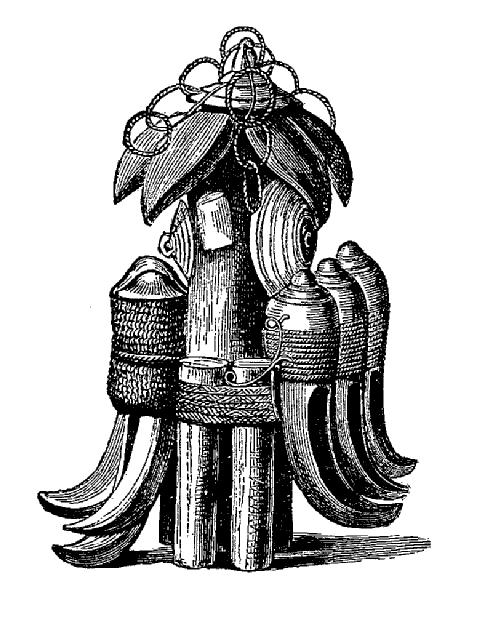
Each sampy was fashioned from diverse components.

A sampy is an amulet or idol of spiritual and political importance among numerous ethnic groups in Madagascar. Amulets and idols fashioned from assorted natural materials have occupied an important place among many Malagasy communities for centuries. Sampy can be classified into two categories. Those that are meant to bless and protect an entire community by serving as a deity figure, and individual amulets that people wear on their person as protection. The latter are called Ody. The Sampy are sometimes considered autonomous beings; having their own name, their own characteristics, their own purposes, their own conditions and even their own home. Among the most famous are Ikelimaza, Rafantaka and Ramahavaly.

Ody, personal amulets believed to protect or allocate powers to the wearer, were commonplace objects possessed by anyone from slave children to kings. The name sampy was given to those amulets that, while physically indistinguishable from ody, were distinct in that their powers extended over an entire community. The sampy were often personified - complete with a distinct personality - and offered their own house with keepers dedicated to their service.

In the sixteenth century, King Ralambo of the Merina people amassed twelve of the most reputed and powerful sampy from neighboring communities. He furthermore transformed the nature of the relationship between sampy and ruler: whereas previously the sampy had been seen as tools at the disposal of community leaders, under Ralambo they became divine protectors of the leader's sovereignty and the integrity of the state which would be preserved through their power on the condition that the line of sovereigns ensured the sampy were shown the respect due to them. By collecting the twelve greatest sampy (twelve being a sacred number in Merina cosmology) and transforming their nature, Ralambo strengthened the supernatural power and legitimacy of the royal line of Imerina.

The Tantara ny Andriana eto Madagasikara offers an account of the idols' introduction into Imerina. According to legend, one day during Ralambo's reign a woman named Kalobe arrived in Imerina carrying a small object wrapped in banana leaves and grass. She had traveled from her village located at Isondra in Betsileo country to the south which had been destroyed by fire, walking the great distance and traveling only at night in order to deliver to the king what she called kelimalaza ("the little famous one"), giving the impression that it was no less than the greatest treasure in the land. Ralambo took the sampy and built a house for it in a nearby village. He then selected a group of adepts who were to study under Kalobe to learn the mysteries of the kelimalaza. Oral history maintains that Kalobe was "made to disappear" after the adepts' training was completed in order to prevent her from absconding with the precious idol.

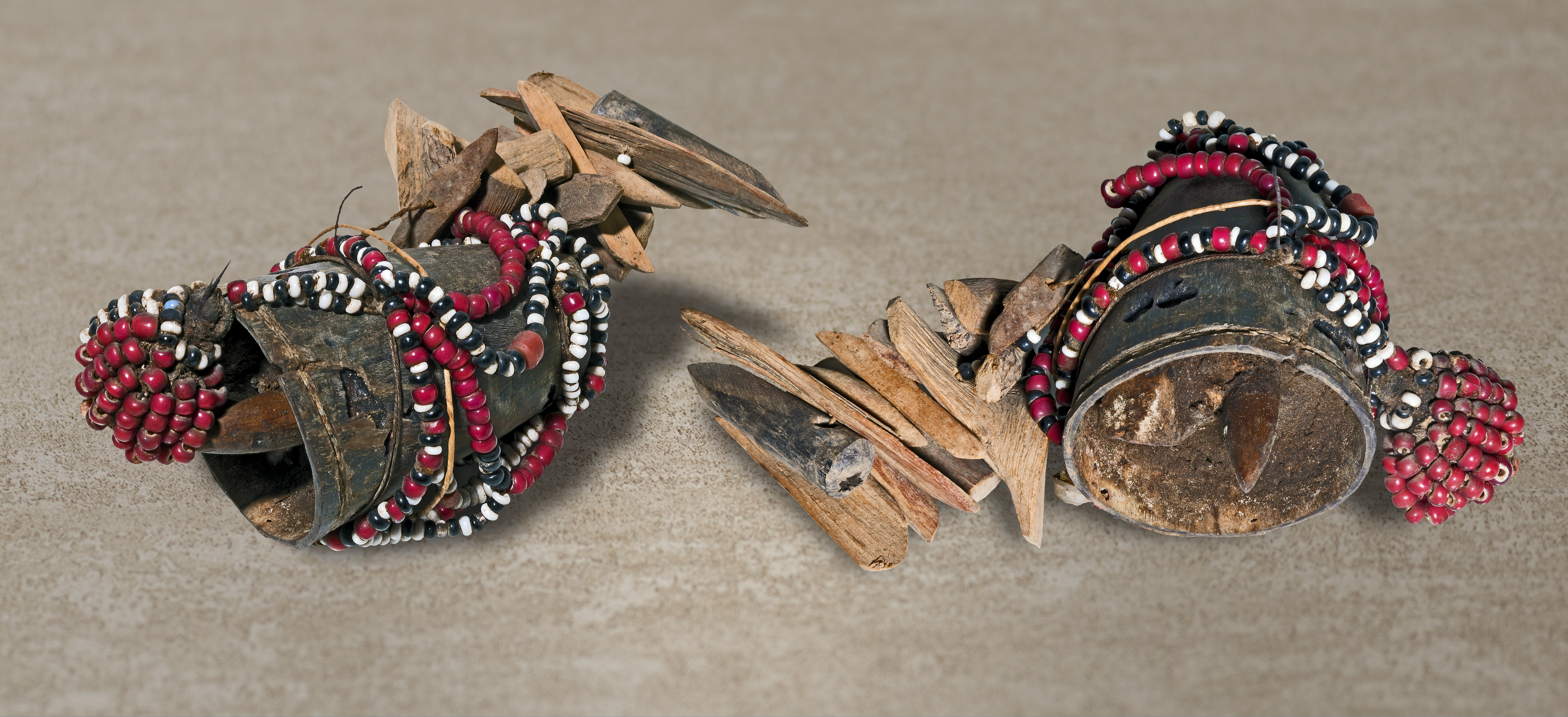
Ody made of horn, wood, beads and shells

Not long after, the legend continues, a group of Sakalava (or, by some accounts, Vazimba) warriors were preparing to attack a village north of Alasora called Ambohipeno. Ralambo announced that it would be sufficient to throw a rotten egg at the warriors, and kelimalaza would take care of the rest. According to oral history, the egg was thrown and hit a warrior in the head, killing him on contact; his corpse fell onto another warrior and killed him, and this corpse fell onto another and so forth, until the warriors had all been destroyed, forevermore confirming the power of kelimalaza as the protector of the kingdom in the minds of the Merina populace. Similarly, at the besieged Imerina village of Ambohimanambola, invoking kelimalaza was said to have produced a massive hailstorm that wiped out the enemy warriors.

The honored place that Ralambo awarded to kelimalaza encouraged others like Kalobe to bring their own sampy to Ralambo from neighboring lands where they had long before been introduced by the Antaimoro. First after kelimalaza was ramahavaly, said to control snakes and repel attacks. The next arrival, manjakatsiroa, protected the sovereignty of the king from rivals and became the favorite of Ralambo, who kept it always near him. Afterward came rafantaka, believed to protect against injury and death; others followed, all of Antaimoro origin with the possible exception of mosasa, which had come from the Tanala forest people to the east. The propagation of similar sampy at the service of less powerful citizens consequently increased throughout Imerina under Ralambo's rule: nearly every village chief, as well as many common families, had one in their possession and claimed the powers and protection their communal sampy offered them.

These lesser sampy were destroyed or reduced to the status of ody (personal talismans) by the end of the reign of Ralambo's son, Andrianjaka, officially leaving only twelve truly powerful sampy (known as the sampin'andriana: the "Royal Sampy") which were all in the possession of the king. These royal sampy, including kelimalaza, were protected by "keepers of the sampy", who were often consulted by rulers and had become considerable power brokers by the 19th century. The sampy continued to be worshiped until their destruction in a bonfire by Queen Ranavalona II upon her public conversion to Christianity in 1869.
