= Andrianjaka =

King of Imerina
- Reign: c. 1612–1630
- Predecessor: Ralambo
- Successor: Andriantsitakatrandriana
- Died: c. 1630; Antananarivo
- Burial: Fitomiandalana, Rova of Antananarivo
- Spouse: Ravadifo
- Issue: One son (Andriantsitakatrandriana) and one daughter; two others stillborn
- Dynasty: Hova dynasty
- Father: Ralambo
- Mother: Ratsitohinina

Andrianjaka reigned over the Kingdom of Imerina in the central highlands region of Madagascar from around 1612 to 1630. Despite being the younger of King Ralambo's two sons, Andrianjaka succeeded to the throne on the basis of his strength of character and skill as a military tactician. The most celebrated accomplishment of his reign was the capture of the hill of Analamanga from a Vazimba king. There he established the fortified compound (rova) that would form the heart of his new capital city of Antananarivo. Upon his orders, the first structures within this fortified compound (known as the Rova of Antananarivo) were constructed: several traditional royal houses were built, and plans for a series of royal tombs were designed. These buildings took on an enduring political and spiritual significance, ensuring their preservation until being destroyed by fire in 1995. Andrianjaka obtained a sizable cache of firearms and gunpowder, materials that helped to establish and preserve his dominance and expand his rule over greater Imerina.

Many of the cultural practices that were to define Merina social and political life for centuries are credited to Andrianjaka. He designated the twelve sacred hills of Imerina that were to become the spiritual and political heartland of the Merina empire, contributing to the establishment of the kingdom's traditional boundaries; clans were assigned to specific regions within his kingdom, further defining the cultural landscape. He consolidated power through such measures as appropriating the folk tradition of sampy (community talismans), thereby ensuring all the powers traditionally attributed to these idols were under the control of the sovereign alone. Merina traditions related to the burial and mourning of sovereigns are also traced back to Andrianjaka's reign.

== Early life ==
Andrianjaka was the second son of Ralambo, ruler of the Kingdom of Imerina in the central highlands of Madagascar. As a young man, Andrianjaka married Ravadifo, a daughter of Prince Andriampanarivomanjaka. The marriage produced one daughter and one son, Andriantsitakatrandriana, who would rule after his father from 1630 to 1650. Andrianjaka was also actively involved in providing support to his father's military campaigns to expand and defend Ralambo's realm. Oral history describes an incident wherein Andrianjaka and Ralambo were engaged in the defense of Ralambo's capital at Ambohidrabiby, which was threatened by the advance of Antsihanaka warriors. Andrianjaka reportedly suggested an innovative defensive tactic to annihilate the enemy by filling the town's hadivory (defensive trenches) with cow dung and rice husks, lighting it on fire, and covering the smoldering embers with burnt rice stalks so that the area resembled a patch of land recently re-cleared for planting through tavy (slash and burn agriculture). The enemy troops reportedly marched into the trap, sinking into the embers and burning or suffocating to death.

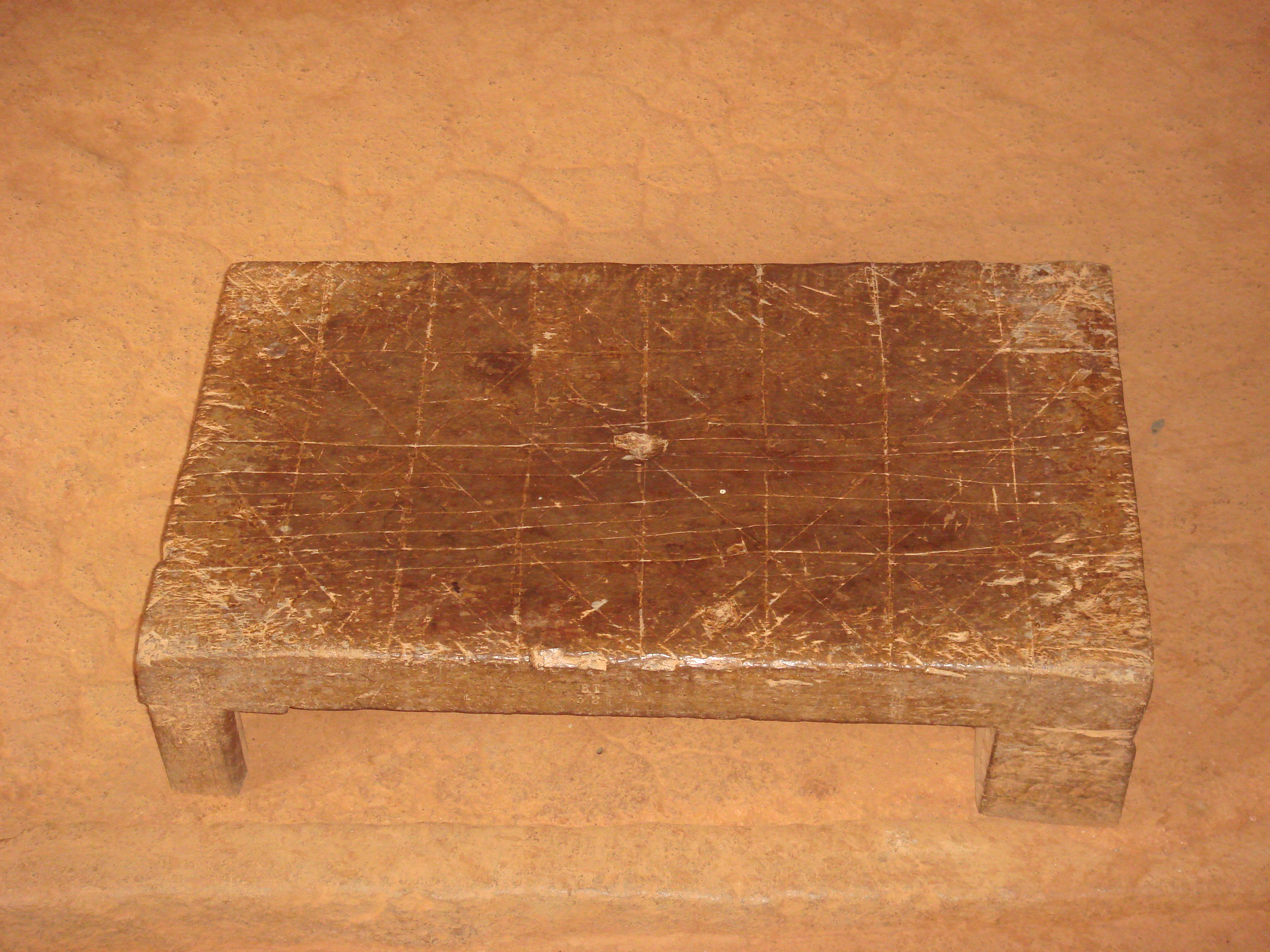
Fanorona board used by Merina sovereigns at Ambohimanga, Madagascar

Oral history provides two different accounts of Andrianjaka's succession to the throne of the Kingdom of Imerina. According to popular legend, Ralambo devised a test to determine which of his two sons was most fit to rule: he would summon them both to join him at his capital in Ambohidrabiby, and whichever of his two sons reached him soonest would inherit his kingdom. In one account of this legend, Andrianjaka was reportedly engrossed in strategizing a win in a difficult game of fanorona and so refused to admit audience to the royal messenger until after the game was over. During this delay, his older brother Andriantompokoindrindra received his father's message and rushed home; he was thus awarded Ralambo's title and kingdom. However, this tale continues, Andriantompokoindrindra's claim to power was rejected by the public, and he was soon forced to cede the throne to Andrianjaka. In an alternate account of the succession tale, it is Andriantompokoindrindra (not Andrianjaka) who was said to be preoccupied with the fanorona game—a version in keeping with the oral tradition that credits him with the game's invention and popularization at court—and his refusal to return to his father until after the game had finished led Ralambo to choose Andrianjaka as his successor. One source states that the summons was not a test, but rather occurred during the aforementioned incident when Ralambo was besieged in his capital by the Antsihanaka warriors and was genuinely in need of his sons' assistance.

It is generally accepted by historians that Andrianjaka did indeed succeed to the throne around 1610 or 1612 after his older brother's claim was rejected by the public. All speculation about fanorona and royal summons aside, Ralambo may have chosen Andrianjaka based on the simple fact that he was the son of Ralambo's first wife. Ralambo's father, Andriamanelo, had established rules of succession by which Ralambo's first son by his first wife must rule after his father in order to fulfill a mandate established by his Vazimba antecedents Rafohy and Rangita. The passing over of Andriantompokoindrindra in favor of his younger brother was partially mitigated by the establishment of a royal tradition maintaining that all reigning descendants of Andrianjaka would henceforth be required to marry a princess directly descended from Andriantompokoindrindra, thereby preserving the royal status of descendants in both brothers' bloodlines.

== Reign ==
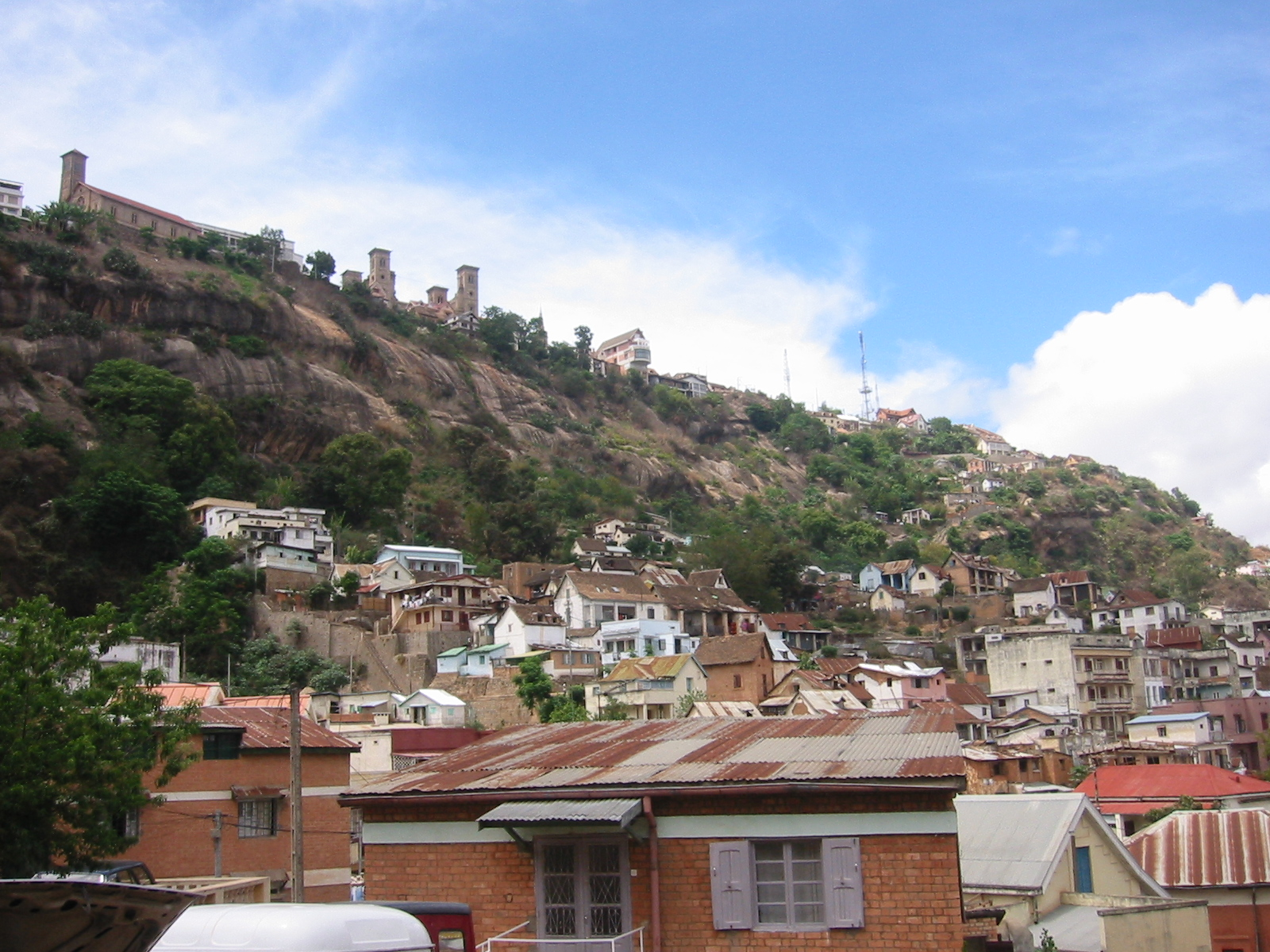
View of the hill of Analamanga, 400 years after Andrianjaka seized it from the Vazimba

Andrianjaka moved his capital from Ambohidrabiby to Ambohimanga upon ascending to the throne around 1610 or 1612. He was reportedly the first Merina leader to receive Europeans around 1620 and traded slaves in exchange for guns and other firearms to aid in the pacification of rival principalities, obtaining 50 guns and three barrels of gunpowder to equip his army. He unified the principalities on what he later designated as the twelve sacred hills of Imerina at Ambohitratrimo, Ambohimanga, Ilafy, Alasora, Antsahadita, Ambohimanambony, Analamanga, Ambohitrabiby, Namehana, Ambohidrapeto, Ambohijafy, and Ambohimandranjaka. These hills became and remain the spiritual heart of Imerina, which was further expanded over a century later when Andrianampoinimerina redesignated the twelve sacred hills to include several different sites.

His policies and tactics highlighted and increased the separation between the king and his subjects. Andrianjaka transformed social divisions into spatial divisions by assigning each clan to a specific geographical region within his kingdom. He made a demonstration of royal power by appropriating the local tradition of sampy (talismans), previously created by village chiefs and others for personal or local spiritual ends, restricting their number to twelve and declaring their creation a strictly royal prerogative. The king also imposed an intimidating change to the traditional form of justice, the trial by ordeal: Andrianjaka ordered that rather than administering tangena poison to an accused person's rooster to determine their innocence by the creature's survival, the poison would instead be ingested by the accused himself.

=== Founding of Antananarivo ===
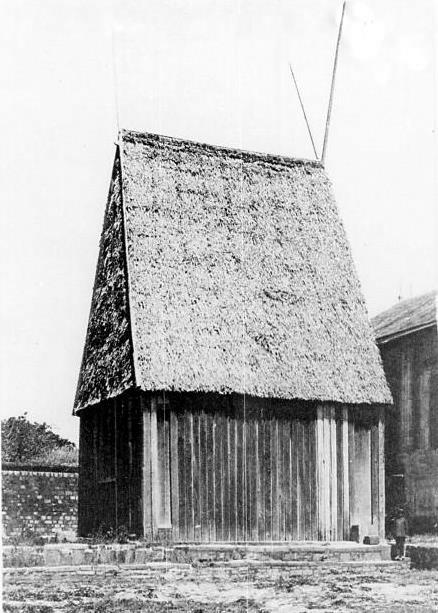
Besakana, Andrianjaka's residence at the Rova of Antananarivo

Around 1610 or 1625 according to various estimations, Andrianjaka commanded a garrison of 1,000 soldiers to seize the hill of Analamanga ("Blue Forest")—at 1,480 metres (4,860 ft) above sea level, then the highest and most strategically important in the region—from its Vazimba inhabitants. He constructed a royal fortified compound (rova) on the hilltop as the capitol of a new town at the site which he named Antananarivo ("the city of the thousand") in honor of the thousand soldiers who aided in capturing and protecting the hill. He reportedly succeeded with minimal bloodshed: according to oral history, the encampment of his army at the foot of Analamanga was sufficient to secure the submission of the Vazimba. Andrianjaka made Antananarivo the capital of his realm. From his position atop Analamanga, he was well-placed to exert control over the vast plains of Betsimitatatra below. Under his command the plains were gradually transformed into vast, surplus-producing rice paddies. This feat was accomplished by mobilizing large numbers of his able-bodied subjects to construct dikes that enabled the redirection of rainwater for controlled flooding of planted areas.

Andrianjaka's fortified compound came to be known as the Rova of Antananarivo and constituted the heart of his newly founded city of Antananarivo. Prior to Andrianjaka's rule, Merina sovereigns shifted their capital from one town to another, but with the establishment of the rova on the peak of Analamanga hill, Antananarivo was to become the capital of the Kingdom of Imerina (and, ultimately, the 19th-century Kingdom of Madagascar) for generations of Merina sovereigns. The heart of the town was built in stages: first, the army cleared the forest covering the hill's summit and constructed the rova compound to serve as an initial garrison enclosing a traditional-style wooden house (lapa) that served as a residence for the king. Soon thereafter, two more houses were constructed; Andrianjaka also designated the construction space and design for a row of royal tombs. In keeping with Merina aristocratic tradition, each structure in the compound was given a name. The row of tombs was named Fitomiandalana ("Seven Aligned Tombs"), Andrianjaka's own tomb being the first of these constructed. According to one account, the very first royal house constructed within the Rova of Antananarivo was named Besakana ("Great Breadth") and served as the personal residence of Andrianjaka. This account is contradicted by another source that states the second and third houses were called Masoandrotsiroa and Besakana, with the latter again characterized as Andrianjaka's personal residence, leaving the precise origins of Besakana unclear.

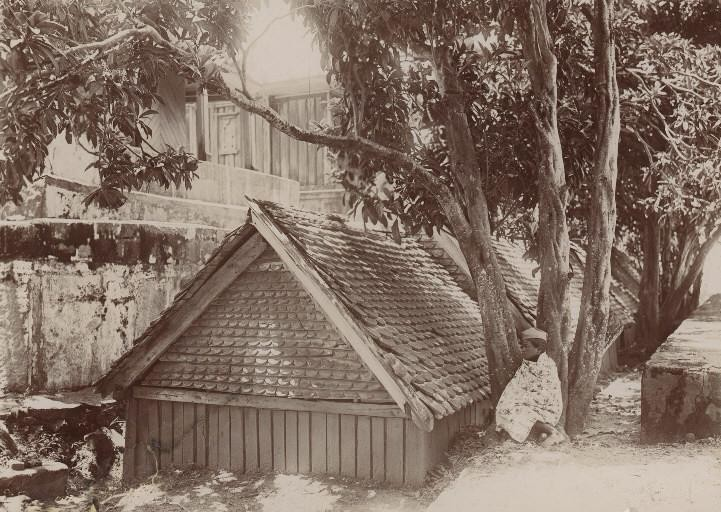
Andrianjaka's tomb

The Besakana, Masoandrotsiroa and Fitomiandalana structures at the Rova of Antananarivo were preserved and maintained over the centuries by successive generations of Merina sovereigns, imbuing the structures with deep symbolic and spiritual meaning. As Andrianjaka's residence, the Besakana was particularly significant: the original building was torn down and reconstructed in the same design by Andriamasinavalona around 1680, and again by Andrianampoinimerina in 1800, each of whom inhabited the building in turn as their personal residence. King Radama I likewise inhabited the building for much of his time at the Rova, and in 1820 he designated the building as the first site to house what came to be known as the Palace School, the first formal European-style school in Imerina. Sovereigns were enthroned in this building and their mortal remains were displayed here before burial, rendering Besakana "the official state room for civil affairs... regarded as the throne of the kingdom."

== Death and succession ==
The rule of Andrianjaka continued uninterrupted until his death at the Rova of Antananarivo around 1630. He was the first king to be buried on the grounds of the Rova, his tomb forming the first of the Fitomiandalana. To commemorate his greatness, his subjects erected a small wooden house called a trano masina on top of his tomb. Future Merina sovereigns and nobles continued to construct similar tomb houses on their tombs well into the 19th century. According to oral history, the institution of lengthy formal mourning periods for deceased sovereigns in Imerina may also have begun with the death of Andrianjaka. He was succeeded by his son, Andriantsitakatrandriana.

== Bibliography ==
- Administration Colonielle (1898). "L'habitation à Madagascar". Colonie de Madagascar: Notes, reconnaissances et explorations (in French). Vol. 4. Imprimerie Officielle de Tananarive.
- Administration Colonielle (1898). Notes, reconnaissances et explorations, Volume 4 (in French). Tananarive: Imprimerie Officielle de Tananarive.
- Callet, François (1972) [1908]. Tantara ny andriana eto Madagasikara (histoire des rois) (in French). Antananarivo: Imprimerie catholique.
- Campbell, Gwyn (2005). An economic history of Imperial Madagascar, 1750–1895: the rise and fall of an island empire. Cambridge, U.K.: Cambridge University Press. ISBN 978-0-521-83935-8.
- Chapus, Georges-Sully; Dandouau, Andre (1961). Manuel d'histoire de Madagascar (in French). Paris: Maisonneuve & Larose.
- Desmonts (2004). Madagascar (in French). New York: Editions Olizane. ISBN 978-2-88086-387-6.
- Featherman, Americus (1888). Social history of the races of mankind Volume 2, Part 2. London: Trübner & co.
- Fox, Leonard (1990). Hainteny: the traditional poetry of Madagascar. Cranbury, NJ: Associated University Presses, Inc. ISBN 978-0-8387-5175-6.
- Frémigacci, Jean (1999). "Le Rova de Tananarive: Destruction d'un lieu saint ou constitution d'une référence identitaire?". In Chrétien, Jean-Pierre (ed.). Histoire d'Afrique (in French). Paris: Editions Karthala. ISBN 9782865379040.
- Kent, Raymond (1970). Early Kingdoms in Madagascar: 1500–1700. London: Holt, Rinehart and Winston.
- Lévi-Strauss, Claude (1992). The view from afar. Chicago: University of Chicago Press. ISBN 978-0-226-47474-8.
- Oliver, Samuel (1886). Madagascar: an historical and descriptive account of the island and its former dependencies, Volume 1. London: Macmillan.
- Piolet, Jean-Baptiste (1895). Madagascar et les Hova: description, organisation, histoire (in French). Paris: C. Delagrave.
- Raison-Jourde, François (1983). Les Souverains de Madagascar (in French). Berlin: Karthala Editions.
- Ralibera, Daniel (1993). Madagascar et le christianisme (in French). Editions Karthala. ISBN 9789290282112.
- Shillington, Kevin (2005). Encyclopedia of African history, Volume 1. New York: CRC Press. ISBN 978-1-57958-453-5.
- Standing, H.F. (1885). "The Tribal Divisions of the Hova Malagasy". The Antananarivo Annual and Madagascar Magazine. Vol. 3. Elsevier.
