= Twelve sacred hills of Imerina =

Hills in Madagascar

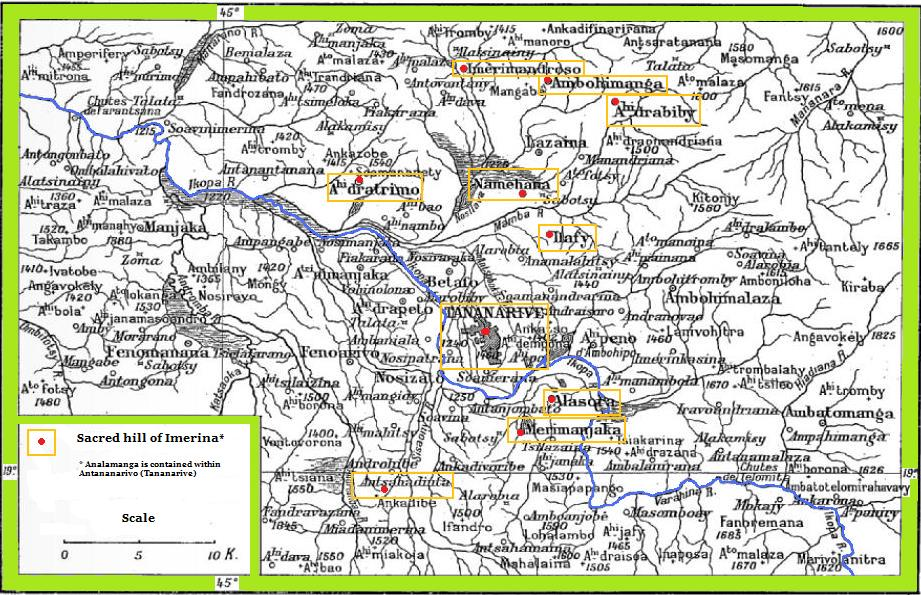
Sacred hills of Imerina

The twelve sacred hills of Imerina are hills of historical significance to the Merina people of Madagascar. Located throughout Imerina, the central area of the highlands of Madagascar, the sites were often ancient capitals, the birthplaces of key public figures, or the tomb sites of esteemed political or spiritual leaders. The first set of sacred sites was designated by early 17th-century king Andrianjaka. The notion was re-sanctified under late 18th-century king Andrianampoinimerina, who replaced several of the earlier sites with new ones. More than 12 sites were thus designated as sacred over time, although the notion of twelve sacred hills was perpetuated because of the significance of the number 12 in Malagasy cosmology. Today, little concrete evidence of the former importance of many of these sites remains, but the significant archeological and cultural heritage of several of the sites has been preserved. The historic significance of the sites is best represented by the Rova of Antananarivo at Analamanga, the ancient fortified city at Alasora, the houses and tombs of the andriana (noble class) at Antsahadinta and the ancient fortifications and palaces at Ambohimanga, protected as a UNESCO World Heritage Site since 2001.

== History ==
According to popular legend, King Andrianjaka (1610–1630) declared twelve hills in Imerina (the central region of the Highlands of Madagascar) to be sacred due to their historical, political or spiritual significance to the Merina people. King Andrianampoinimerina (1787–1810) designated twelve hills in his turn, including several of those first identified by Andrianjaka. Most of these hills served as locations of the capitals of rival kingdoms conquered by Andrianampoinimerina and united under his rule, and many are also the seat of power of historic kings and queens of the Imerina dynasty.

== Key sites ==
Twelve is a sacred number in Merina cosmology and it is commonly said that Andrianampoinimerina had twelve wives and installed one on each of the twelve sacred hills throughout his kingdom. In reality, he had more than twelve wives, and there are more than twelve hills surrounding Antananarivo that claim sacred status. As such, precisely which hills should constitute the list of twelve sacred sites named by Andrianampoinimerina remains a point of some contention, but diverse sources have commonly indicated the following sites:

=== Hill of Alasora ===
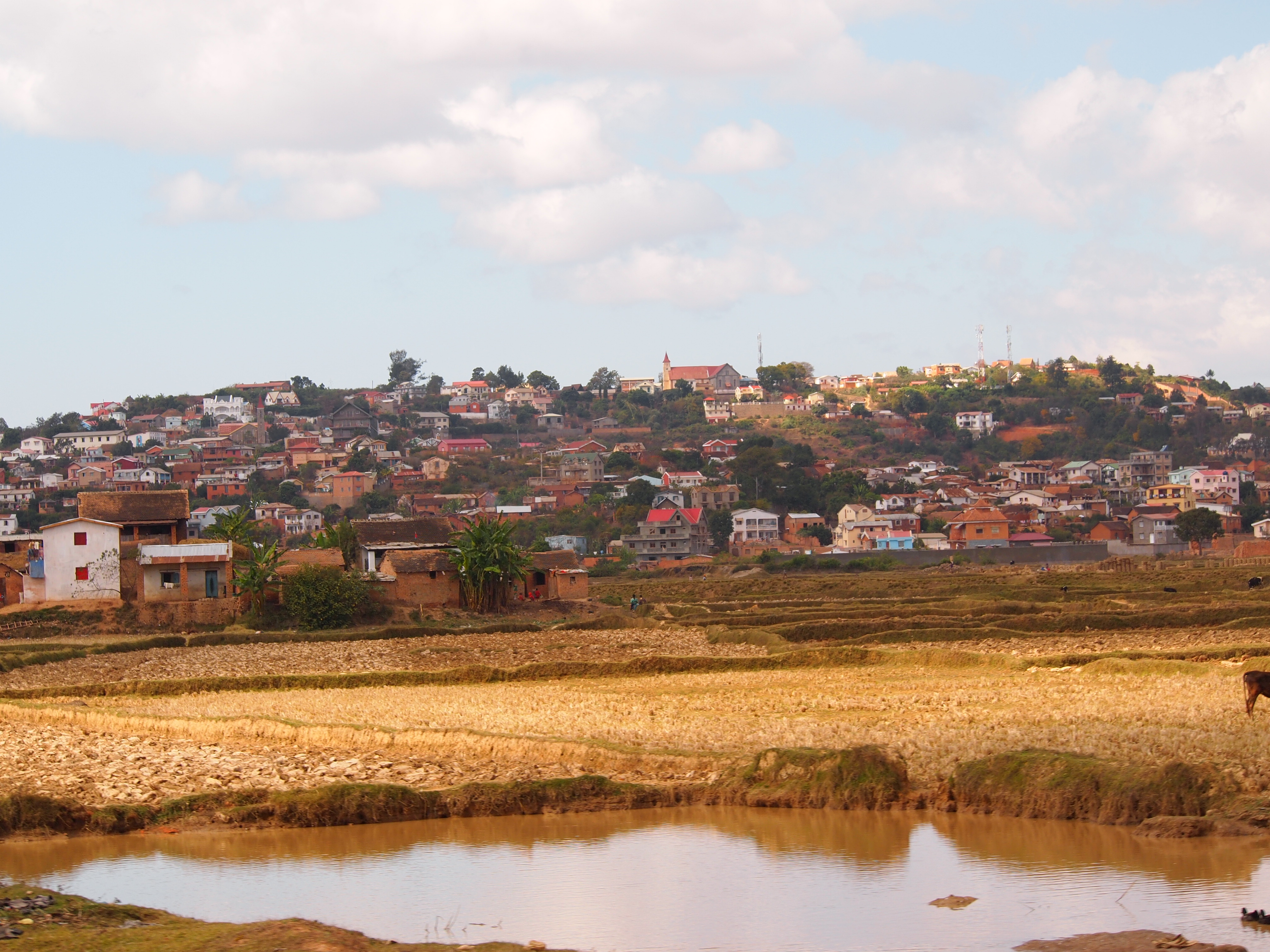
Alasora, 2013

Alasora 1348 m, latitude 18°57'46.08"S, longitude 47° 34'09.74"E. (15 km northeast of Antananarivo) Alasora is one of the oldest villages in Imerina, believed to have been founded by Prince Ramasimparihy in 1490. Ruling from Imerimanjaka, vazimba Queen Rangita (1500–1520) and her brother Andrianamponga gave the site its current name. Under Rangita's daughter, Queen Rafohy (1520–1540), the capital of the region was moved from Imerimanjaka to Alasora. Some of the monumental features of the site were added upon the orders of her son, King Andriamanelo (1540–1575), including the hadivory and hadifetsy (defensive trenches around the town), as well as the vavahady, a town gate protected by a large rolled stone disc acting as a barrier and shaded by aviavy (fig trees), symbolic of royalty. This town model was subsequently adopted throughout Imerina. Andriamanelo's tomb is located here.

=== Hill of Ambohidrabiby ===
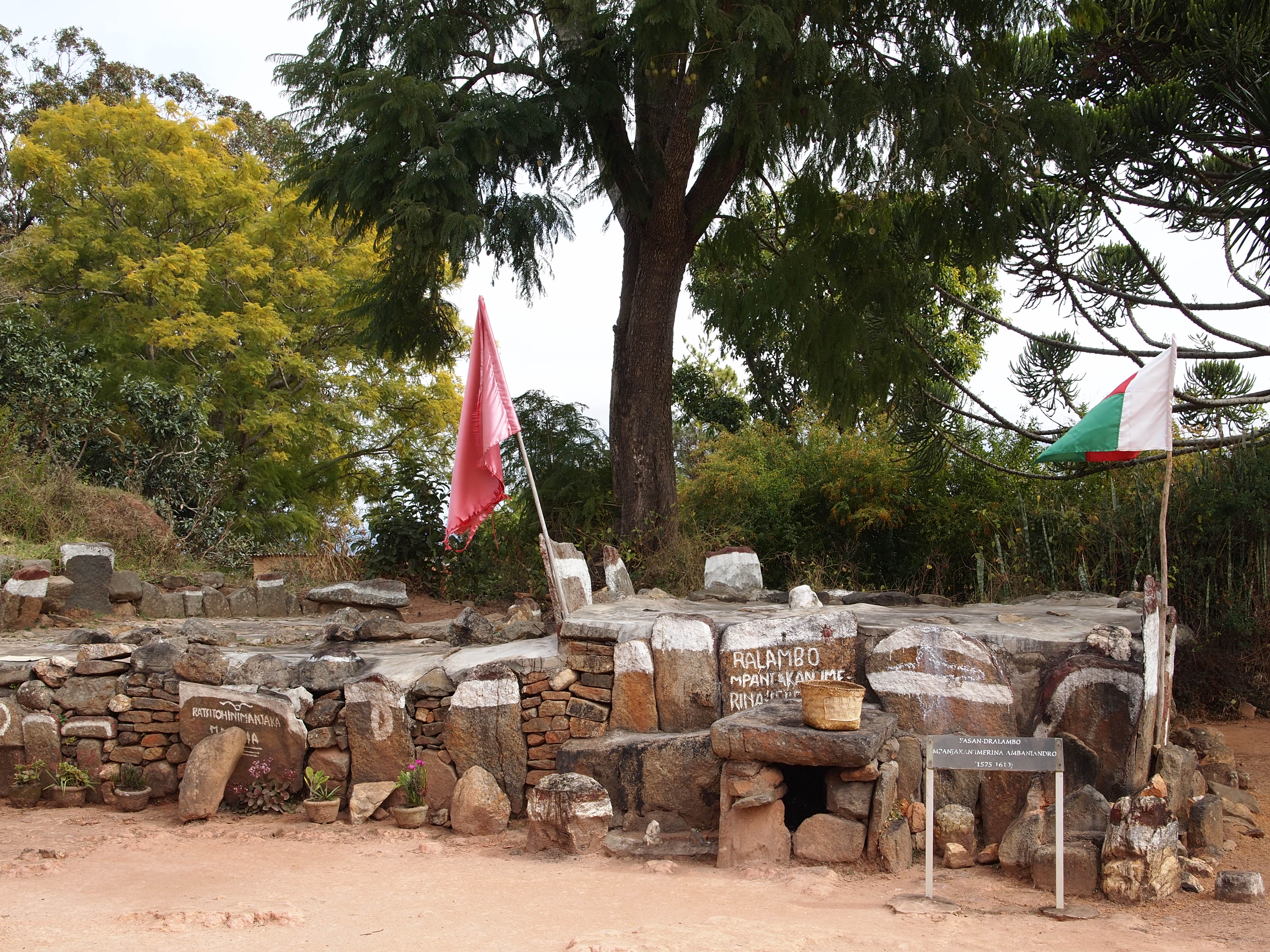
Tomb of Ralambo in Ambohitrabiby

Ambohidrabiby (or Ambohitrabiby) (20 km north of Antananarivo): Site of the capital of King Ralambo (1575–1610), who is buried here, along with his Vazimba grandfather (or father-in-law) Rabiby, a renowned astrologer for whom the hill is named.

=== Hill of Ambohidratrimo ===
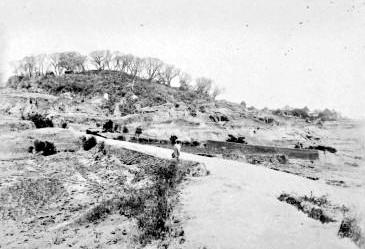
Ambohidratrimo, 1901

Ambohidratrimo 1352 m, latitude 18°49'25.52"S, longitude 47°26'48.70"E. (17 km the north of Antananarivo). Named for King Ratrimo who, in the mid-12th century, was according to oral history the first king to have established rule over the territory. After several unsuccessful attempts to capture the hill by force, Andrianampoinimerina finally managed to successfully incorporate the territory into his kingdom by marriage with his first wife, Rambolamasoandro, princess of Ambohidratrimo and eventual mother of his son and successor Radama I.

=== Hill of Ambohimanga ===
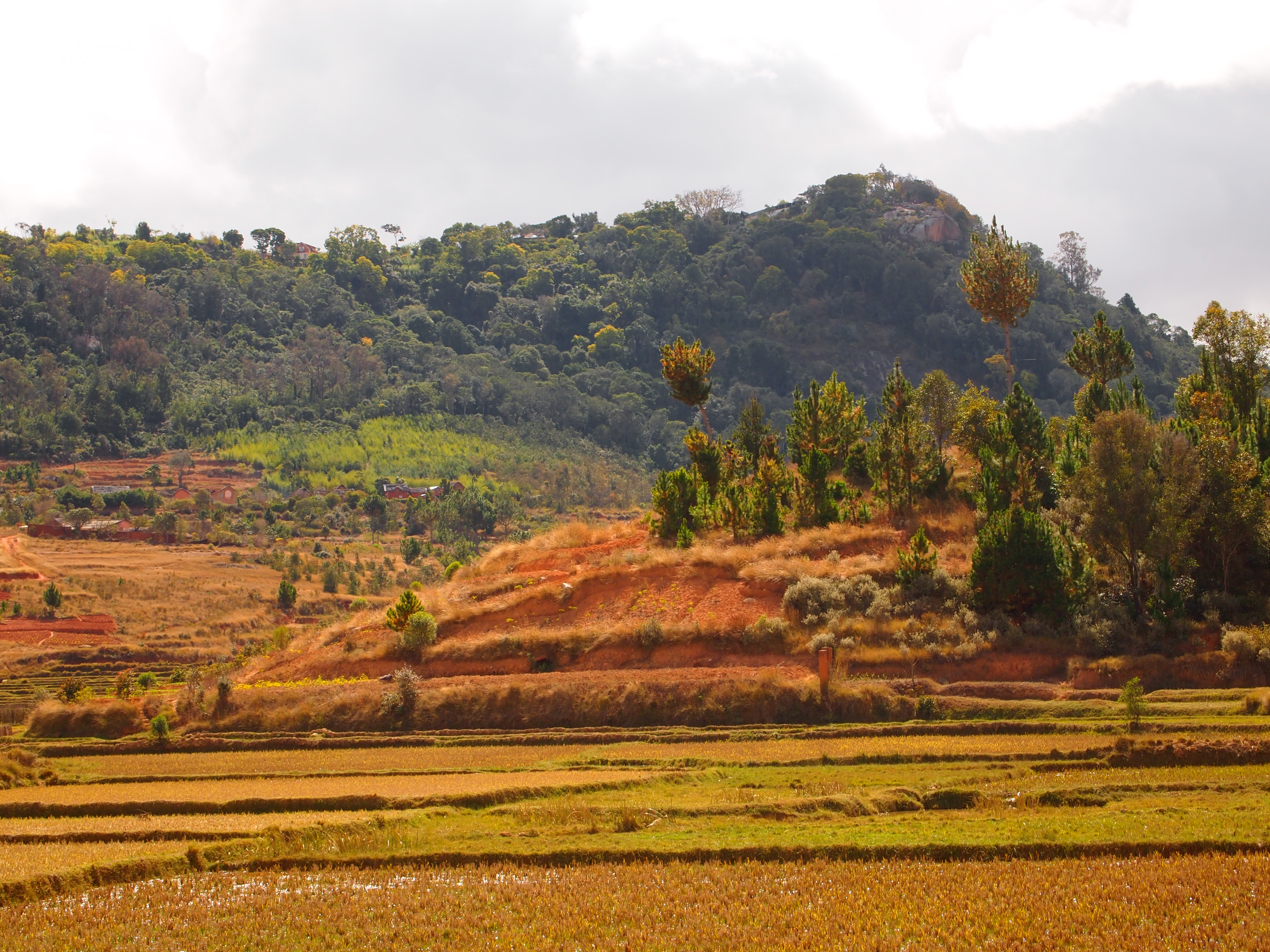
Ambohimanga, 2013

Ambohidratrimo ("Blue hill"), 1456 m, latitude 18°45'66.18"S, longitude 47°33'69.30"E. (21 km north of Antananarivo): Site of the capital of Imerina under Andrianampoinimerina, Ambohimanga was designated a World Heritage Site by UNESCO in 2001.

=== Hill of Analamanga ===
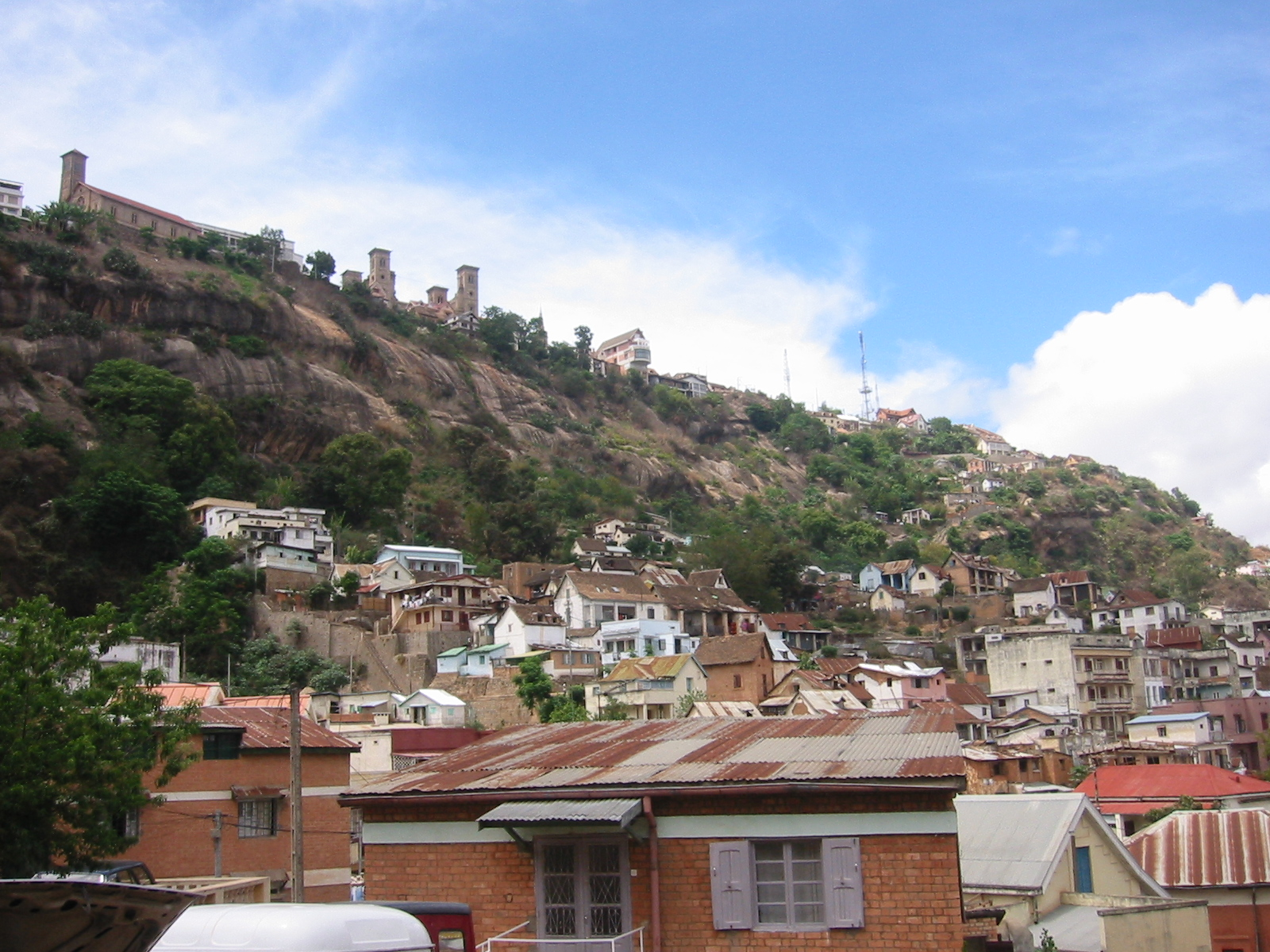
Analamanga, 2005

Analamanga ("Blue forest"), Latitude 18°55'24.86"S, longitude 47°31'56.06"E. (Antananarivo center): Site of the Rova of Antananarivo, Analamanga is the highest hill within the capital city of Antananarivo, upon which the original town was built by King Andrianjaka (1610–1630). The modern region of Analamanga also takes its name from the hill.

=== Hill of Antsahadinta ===
Antsahadinta ("Valley of the leeches"), 1390 m, latitude 19°00'72.18"S, longitude 47°27'45.00"E. Founded and built by king Andriamangarira (1725–1775), grandson of Andriamasinavalona, king of Imerina (1675–1710). Seat of power in western Imerina and the site of numerous well-preserved wooden aristocratic houses, one of the first 12 public schools built by James Cameron and other LMS missionaries under Radama I, and several important royal tombs dating back over 700 years. Among all the royal hills of Imerina, the cultural and archeological heritage contained in this site is second only to Ambohimanga.

=== Hill of Ikaloy ===
Ikaloy 1435 m, latitude 18°35'43.72"S, longitude 47°38'99.76"E. Birthplace of King Andrianampoinimerina. Among the remains of the historic town are a traditional vavahady stone alongside the original stone town gate, numerous ancient unmarked stone tombs and a well-preserved original wooden aristocratic house.

=== Hill of Ilafy ===
Ilafy Latitude 18°51'16.63"S, longitude 47°33'54.43"E. (10 km from Antananarivo): The site of the capital of the kingdom of Andrianjafy (1770–1787), as well as a modest wooden vacation palace constructed by Radama II (1861–1863). Ilafy is also the site of the first arms manufacture in Madagascar, established by Jean Laborde in 1833. The original tomb of King Radama II is located here, and his body was interred in this tomb in 1863 but was later transferred to the tomb of Radama I on the compound of the Rova of Antananarivo in 1897.

=== Hill of Imerimanjaka ===
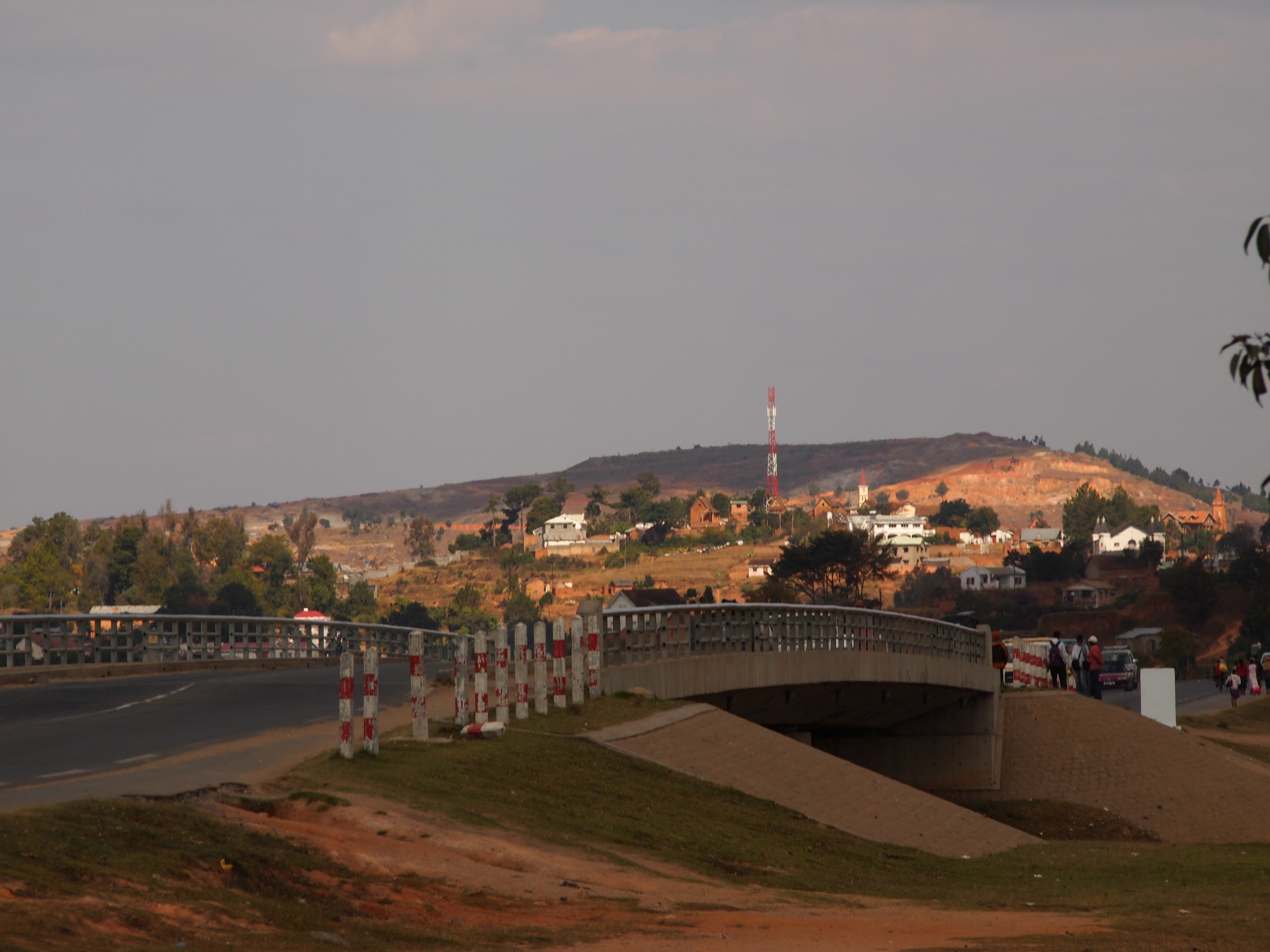
Imerimanjaka, 2013

Imerimanjaka Site of the tombs of two vazimba queens: Rangita, who ruled her kingdom from this territory, and Rafohy, mother of Andriamanelo, the first King of the Imerina dynasty.

=== Hill of Imerimandroso ===
Imerimandroso Latitude 17°25'47.02"S, longitude 48°35'32.58"E. Imerimandroso was a town of importance to the Vazimba.

=== Hill of Namehana ===
Namehana Latitude 18°50'03.00"S, longitude 47°32'55.79"E. Site of a major battle of the Franco-Hova War between the Merina and French forces in 1895.

== Less commonly cited hills ==
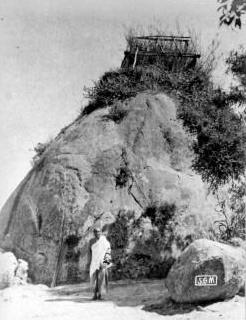
Andriambahoaka tomb site at Ambohiniazy

There are numerous other sites less commonly included among the twelve sacred hills. Chief among these are:

- Ambohijoky (12 km south of Antananarivo): Kingdom of origin of Queen Rabodo, 15th wife of Andrianampoinimerina. At 1519 meters, it is the highest of the twelve sacred hills of Imerina.
- Antongona: Antongona is the site of two historic royal wooden houses and the walled village of Amborano, established in the 17th century.
- Androhibe
- Ampandrana
- Ambohimalaza
- Hiarandriana
- Ambatomanohina
- Ambohidrapeto
- Fenoarivo
- Iharanandriana
- Ambohidrontsy (Ambohihontsy, Ambohimanambola)
- Ambohitrondrana
- Amboatany:
- Ambohiniazy: Site where the Andriambahoaka were traditionally buried.
- Ambohijafy
- Ambohimandranjaka
