= Andriandravindravina =

According to some versions of the genealogy of the Merina people of the central Highlands of Madagascar, Andriandravindravina is the name of the first sovereign of the Highlands. He was not Merina but rather a vazimba, the mysterious first inhabitants of Madagascar that successive waves of settlers encountered upon arrival there. The Tantara ny Andriana eto Madagasikara, the famed genealogy of the Merina aristocracy, states that Andriandravindravina ("Prince of the Leaves", an allusion to the eastern forests he would have needed to traverse to reach the central plateau) ruled over Ambohitsitakatra in northern Imerina where he was reportedly buried. His three sons were:

- Andrianoranorana ("Prince of Constant Rain"), the oldest, who settled on the seaside at Maroantsetra.
- Andriamanjavona, who settled at Angavo, where he married the goddess Andriambavirano ("Princess of the Water," who is said to have drifted down from the heavens into the lake at the summit of Angavo incarnated as a fragrant leaf).
- Andriananjavonana, who settled at Anandribe, west of Angavo.

As the first sovereign of the Highlands, Andriandravindravina would represent an ancestor of Queens Rangita and Rafohy, themselves antecedents of King Andriamanelo, commonly viewed as the originator of the Merina royal dynasty in Imerina. As such, this Malagasy origin myth can either complement or compete with the genealogy that traces the origins of the Merina aristocracy back to the god-king Andrianerinerina.

== The tale of Andriamanjavona ==
In a Merina tale described in the book Tantara ny Andriana eto Madagasikara ("History of the Nobles in Madagascar"), Andriambavirano came down from heaven, goddess Andriambavirano ("Princess of the Water") descends to earth in leaf form. Andriamanjavona, "royal prince of double affiliation" and son of sovereign Andriandravindravina, is destined to take it, which he does by singing a magical charm. He captures the leaf and takes it home. The leaf becomes a woman named Andriambavirano and they marry. The "vadibe", the first wife, casts away Andriambavirano's three children (two boys and a girl), but they are saved by a foster father. Further sources state the three children (the elder boy named Rabingoanony, the younger boy Andrianjatovorovola and the girl Ratandratandravola) are saved by a creature called Konantitra and later become heroes and heroines.
