= Ramaniraka =

Malagasy statesman and minister

Ramaniraka (born c. 1842), nephew of the historian and author Raombana, was a Malagasy statesman and minister. He was appointed Principal Secretary of State for Foreign Affairs from 1862 to 1863, and Minister of Trade in 1862. He was part of the Special Embassy in the United Kingdom, France, Germany, and the United States of America from 1882 to 1883.

Ramaniraka was born to an Andriana family from Antananarivo. His father, Rahaniraka, and his uncle, Raombana, were historians and authors educated in England.
