= List of Malagasy flags =

This is a list of flags currently or historically used in Madagascar.

== Current ==
=== Political ===
2:3 Flag of the Republic of Madagascar

2:3 Presidential standard

=== Military ===
2:3 Flag of the Chief of Army Staff in the rank of Brigade General

2:3 Flag of the Chief of Army Staff in the rank of Divisional General

1:2 Pennant of the Chief of the Naval Air Force Staff in the rank of Commodore or below

1:2 Pennant of the Chief of the Naval Air Force Staff in the rank of Rear Admiral

1:2 Pennant of the Chief of the Naval Air Force Staff in the rank of Vice Admiral

1:2 Pennant of the Commander of a Naval Group

1:2 Pennant of the Commander of a Naval Base

1:20 Masthead pennant

=== Ethnic ===
2:3 Flag of the Merina people (since 1997)

== Historical ==
2:3 Flag of the Antankarana Kingdom

2:3 Flag of the Antongil Kingdom

2:3 Flag of the Boina Kingdom

2:3 Flag of the Menabe Kingdom

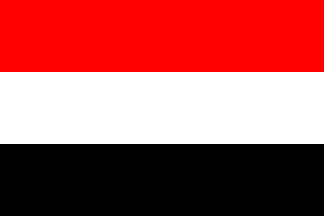
Flag of the Sakalava of Antalaotra

1:1 First flag of the Tamatave Kingdom, 1750–1819

2:3 Second flag of the Tamatave Kingdom, 1819–1822

2:3 Third flag of the Tamatave Kingdom, 1822–1826

2:3 Fourth and final flag of the Tamatave Kingdom, 1826–1828

2:3 Flag of the Tanibe Kingdom, 1822–1828

2:3 Royal standard of Merina Kingdom, c. 1787–1897

2:3 Flag of the Merina Kingdom, c. 1810–1881

2:3 Flag of the Merina Kingdom and Malagasy Protectorate, 1881–1897

Ensign of the French Royal Navy on Saint-Mary island from 1750 until the French Revolution, then 1814 and 1815–1830

2:3 Flag of the French Third Republic, Vichy France, the Provisional Government of the French Republic and the French Fourth Republic, 1896–1942 and 1944–1958

2:3 Flag of the British Occupation, 1942–1943

2:3 Flag of Free France, 1943–1944

=== Presidential standards ===
==== Malagasy Republic ====
2:3 Philibert Tsiranana, 1959

2:3 Philibert Tsiranana, 1959–1972, obverse side

2:3 Philibert Tsiranana, 1959–1972, reverse side

2:3 Gabriel Ramanantsoa, 1972–1975, obverse side

2:3 Gabriel Ramanantsoa, 1972–1975, reverse side

==== Democratic Republic of Madagascar ====
2:3 Didier Ratsiraka, 1976–1993, obverse side

2:3 Didier Ratsiraka, 1976–1993, reverse side

==== Third Republic of Madagascar ====
2:3 Albert Zafy, 1993–1996, obverse side

2:3 Albert Zafy, 1993–1996, reverse side
