= Rangita =

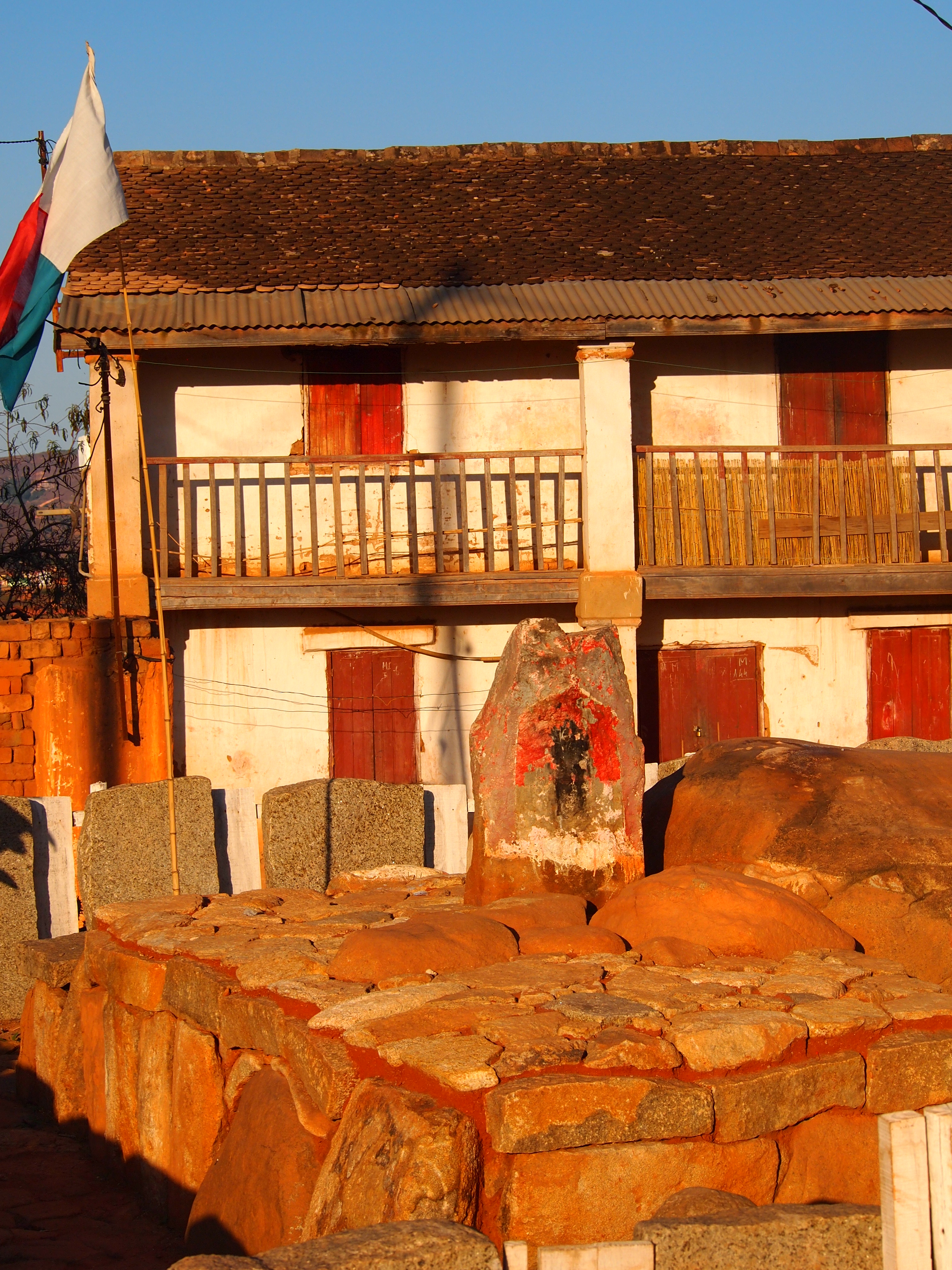
- Symbolic tomb of Rangita in Imerimanjaka

Queen of Alasora
- Reign: 1520–1530
- Predecessor: Andrianmpandramanenitra
- Successor: Rafohy
- Died: 1530; Merimanjaka, Madagascar
- Dynasty: Hova dynasty

Queen Rangita (died 1530), also known as Rangitamanjakatrimovavy, was a Vazimba sovereign who ruled at Merimanjaka in the central highlands of Madagascar after her father, King Andriampandramanenitra (Rafandramanenitra). She was succeeded upon her death by her daughter (some sources say her adopted sister), Queen Rafohy (1530-1540).

Oral tradition is unclear about the roles and relations of Rangita and Rafohy to one another. This lack of clarity includes who was the mother to whom, who succeeded whom and which one was the mother of Andriamanelo. According to one version of the oral tradition, Rangita had two sons, and possibly one daughter, Rafohy. These accounts relate that Rangita shared the stereotypical Vazimba physical characteristics of small stature and dark skin, and her name means "kinky-haired."

It was customary among the Vazimba to submerge the bodies of the dead in bodies of water that were designated as sacred for that purpose; it is said that upon Rangita's death, she (like Rafohy) was placed in a silver coffin made to look like an outrigger canoe, which was then submerged in a sacred bog.

Regnal titles
Preceded by Andrianmpandramanenitra	Queen of Merimanjaka; 1520–1530	Succeeded by Rafohy
