= Andriamanelo =

King of Alasora, founder of the Imerina Kingdom (fl. 1540–1575)

King of Alasora
- Reign: c. 1540–1575
- Predecessor: Rafohy (or Rangita)
- Successor: Ralambo
- Born: Merimanjaka
- Died: c. 1575; Alasora, Kingdom of Imerina
- Burial: Alasora
- Spouse: Ramaitsoanala
- Issue: (6 stillborn/died in infancy); Ralambo
- Dynasty: Hova dynasty
- Father: Manelobe
- Mother: Rafohy (or Rangita)

Andriamanelo (fl. 1540–1575) was king of Alasora in the central highlands region of Madagascar. He is generally considered by historians to be the founder of the Kingdom of Imerina and originator of the Merina royal line that, by the 19th century, had extended its rule over virtually all of Madagascar. The son of a Vazimba mother and a man of the newly arrived Hova people originating in southeast Madagascar, Andriamanelo ultimately led a series of military campaigns against the Vazimba, beginning a several-decade process to drive them from the Highlands. The conflict that defined his reign also produced many lasting innovations, including the development of fortified villages in the highlands and the use of iron weapons. Oral tradition furthermore credits Andriamanelo with establishing a ruling class of nobles (andriana) and defining the rules of succession. Numerous cultural traditions, including the ritual of circumcision, the wedding custom of vodiondry and the art of Malagasy astrology (sikidy) are likewise associated with this king.

== Early life ==
Andriamanelo was the oldest son of the reigning Vazimba queen (alternately given in the oral histories as Rafohy or Rangita) and her Hova husband Manelobe, who may have had origins in the Zafiraminia people of Anosy. At the time of the marriage between Rafohy and Manelobe, the Hova were a minority clan who had recently moved into the Vazimba-dominated highlands from their ancestral homeland in the southeast. The marriage produced two sons, Andriamanelo and his younger brother Andriamananitany, as well as a sister named Rafotsindrindramanjaka. In a bid to counteract further fracturing of their kingdom, Rafohy and Rangita decided that while the Vazimba had historically been ruled by queens, Andriamanelo would inherit the crown upon his mother's death and would be succeeded not by his own child but by his younger brother. This system of succession, ordered by the queens to be followed for all time, was called fanjakana arindra ("organized government") and applied to families as well: in any instance where there was an elder child and a younger one, the parents would designate an elder child to assume authority within the family upon their death, and that authority would be handed to the designated younger child in the event of the death of the elder child. The queen gave the village of Alasora to Andriamanelo to rule as his territory while she still lived, while Andriamananitany was given the village of Ambohitrandriananahary.

== Reign ==
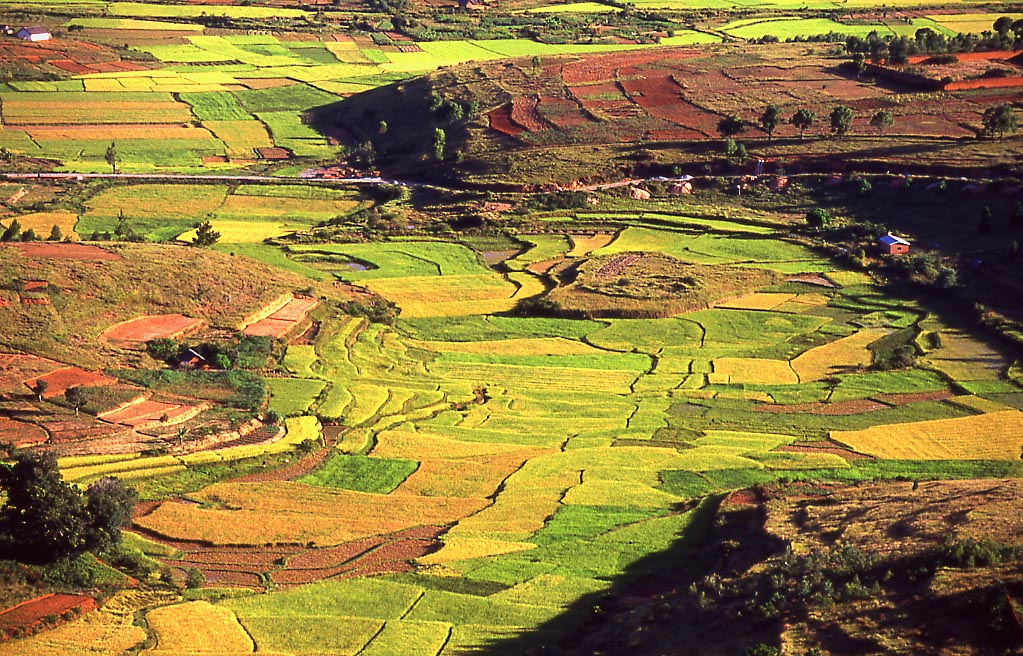
Andriamanelo waged war against the Vazimba in an effort to expel them from the highlands.

Among the distinguishing features of Andriamanelo's reign was the expansion of his territory around the sacred hill of Alasora through a military campaign against the Vazimba to push these legendary, primitive first settlers of Madagascar toward the west of the island. After Andriamanelo had successfully expanded his kingdom to include Alasora to the south and Merimanjaka to the north, the continued presence of a Vazimba stronghold at Analamanga (located between the two halves of his realm and effectively separating them) posed too great a threat to the unity of his kingdom to allow the situation to stand. He resolved to capture Analamanga and drive the Vazimba from his territory, an ambition partially realized during his reign. Popular legend attributes Andriamanelo's military successes to several innovations, including the discovery of iron smelting and propagation of the iron-tipped spear against the Vazimba who fought with weapons of clay. He also fortified his capital at Alasora by creating hadivory (dry moats), hadifetsy (defensive trenches) and vavahady (town gates protected by a large rolled stone disc acting as a barrier), thereby rendering the town more resistant to Vazimba attacks. However, his attempt to establish Merina dominance in the central Highlands was thwarted when he proved unable to seize Analamanga; this Vazimba stronghold would not fall until at last conquered by Andriamanelo's grandson, Andrianjaka.

Warfare was not the only strategy by which Andriamanelo sought to expand the territory under his control. Several years into his reign (after the death of his younger brother) Andriamanelo married a maternal cousin named Ramaitsoanala ("Green Forest") who was a princess through her astrologer father, King Rabiby (for whom his capital, the village of Ambohidrabiby, is named), and her mother Ivorombe who is described in legends as a Vazimba water goddess. Through this union Andriamanelo ensured he would become master of the lands around Ambohidrabiby upon the death of his wife's father. Ramaitsoanala took the name Randapavola upon her marriage and then became known as Queen Rasolobe upon the birth of the couple's seventh and final son, Ralambo—the only one of Andriamanelo's children to survive to adulthood. Six earlier pregnancies ended in stillbirth or the death of the child in infancy.

Andriamanelo is typically portrayed as a civilizing king in contrast to the primitive Vazimba against whom he waged war. As such, oral history credits him with discovering such diverse arts as silversmithing and astrology (sikidy) in addition to iron working. He reputedly introduced knowledge about the construction and use of pirogues, and was the first in the highlands to transform lowland swamps into irrigated rice paddies through the construction of dikes in the valleys around Alasora. The Merina rite of circumcision, described by Bloch (1986) in great detail, continued to be practiced by the Merina monarchy through the end of the 19th century in precisely the way first established by Andriamanelo generations before. Many elements of these rituals continue to form part of the circumcision traditions of Merina families in the 21st century.

Many of the innovations attributed to Andriamanelo were not his personal invention. Rather, their origins can be traced back to the southeastern part of the island that the Hova had left behind as they migrated into the central highlands. Astrology, for instance, had been introduced early to the island by way of trade contacts between coastal Malagasy communities and Arab seafarers. Similarly, archaeological evidence proves the existence of iron implements in Madagascar at least four centuries prior to the war between Andriamanelo and the Vazimba, suggesting that while the technology was not discovered during his reign, Andriamanelo may have been among the first sovereigns in Imerina to make wide-scale use of it in military campaigns.

=== Rules of succession ===
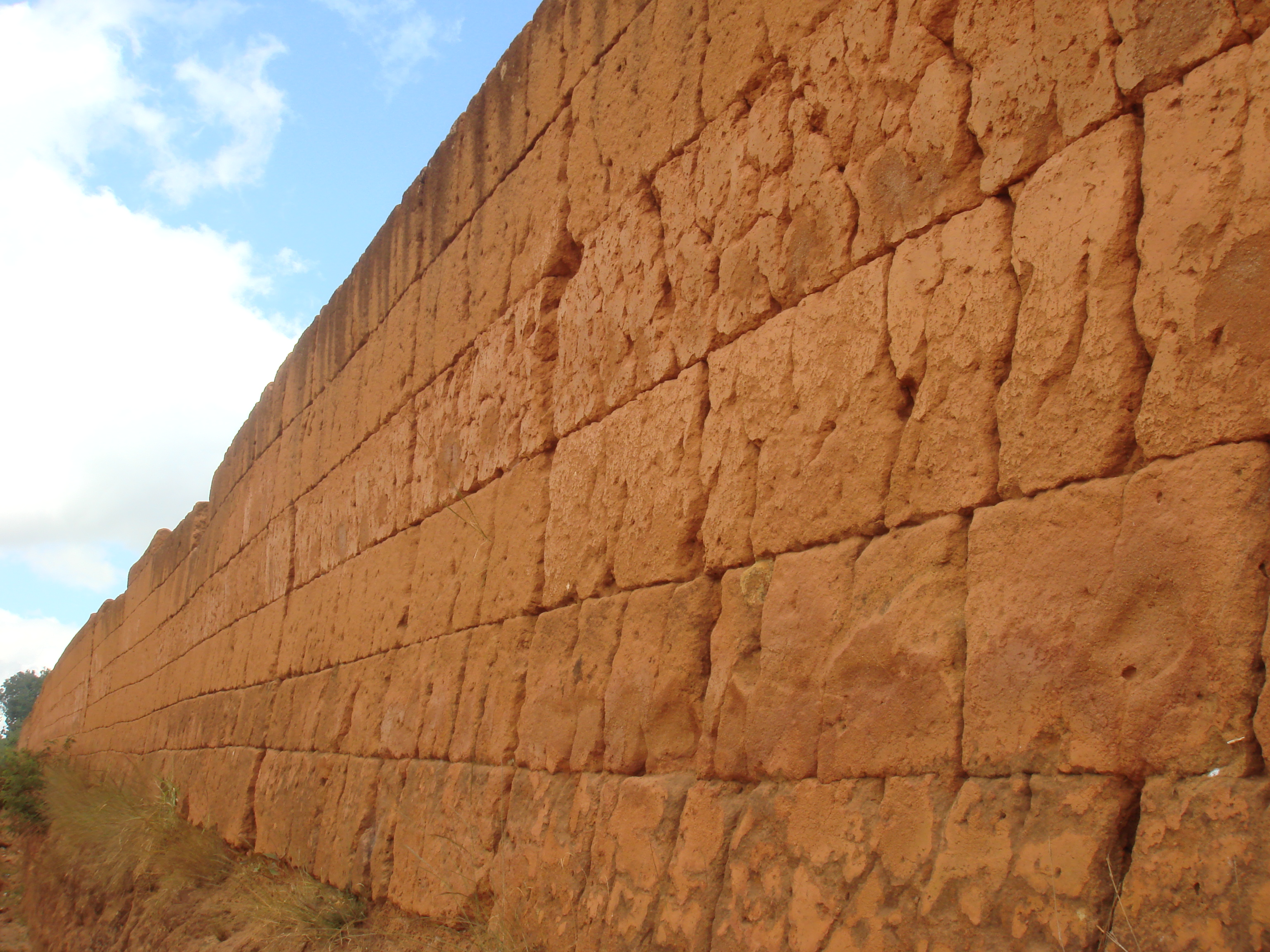
Alasora was the first highland village to be fortified to protect inhabitants throughout Andriamanelo's war with the Vazimba.

Andriamanelo's antecedents, Rafohy and Rangita, had jointly decreed a system of social order whereby the designated heir should have a younger sibling who would succeed him. However, this decree proved challenging upon the first instance of its application. According to oral tradition, upon Rafohy's designation of elder son Andriamanelo as her successor, her younger son Andriamananitany initially claimed to accept her decree. However, Andriamananitany soon began building a new village immodestly named Ambohitrandriamanitra ("Village of God") and copied the system of fortifications introduced by his older brother at Alasora, reportedly constructing them even faster than Andriamanelo. Word spread that Andriamananitany wished to undermine his older brother's rule. Upon learning of Andriamanelo's consequent wrath, Andriamananitany promptly abandoned his "Village of God" and sought permission from his brother to build a village called Ambohimanoa ("Village of Submission") where, according to one version of the oral history, he may have imprudently attempted to construct another defensive trench. Due to this provocative behavior, Andriamanantany was murdered by a group of Hova, possibly at Andriamanelo's command.

Consumed with remorse, the king sought to rectify the situation by arranging a marriage between his brother's orphaned son and Andriamanelo's own sister (the orphan's aunt), Rafotsindrindramanjaka. He declared that the child from this union would, if female, be wed to his own son Ralambo; if male, he would become Ralambo's successor. A girl was born, and she was promised to Ralambo as his future wife with the stipulation that the child born of their union would rule after Ralambo. In this way Andriamanelo established a tradition of succession that indirectly respected the queens' decree by ensuring that a child of his brother's line (and his own) would rule after him. Because of this decree, Ralambo's first son by his second wife was passed over in the line of succession in favor of Andrianjaka, Ralambo's son by Rafotsindrindramanjaka. Andriamanelo was also reportedly the first to formally establish the andriana as a caste of Merina nobles, thereby laying the foundation for a stratified and structured society. From this point forward, the term Hova was used to refer only to the non-noble free people of the society which would later be renamed Merina by Andriamanelo's son Ralambo.

=== Vodiondry ===
The marriage tradition of the vodiondry, still practiced to this day throughout the Highlands, is said to have originated with Andriamanelo. According to oral history, after the sovereign had successfully contracted a marriage with Ramaitsoanala, sole daughter of Vazimba King Rabiby, Andriamanelo sent her a variety of gifts including vodiondry—meat from the hindquarters of a sheep—which he believed to be the tastiest portion. The value placed on this cut of meat was reaffirmed by Ralambo who, upon discovering the edibility of zebu meat, declared the hindquarters of every slaughtered zebu throughout the kingdom to be his royal due. From the time of Andriamanelo forward, it became a marriage tradition for the groom to offer vodiondry to the bride's family. Over time the customary offerings of meat have been increasingly replaced by a symbolic piastre, sums of money and other gifts.

== Death and succession ==
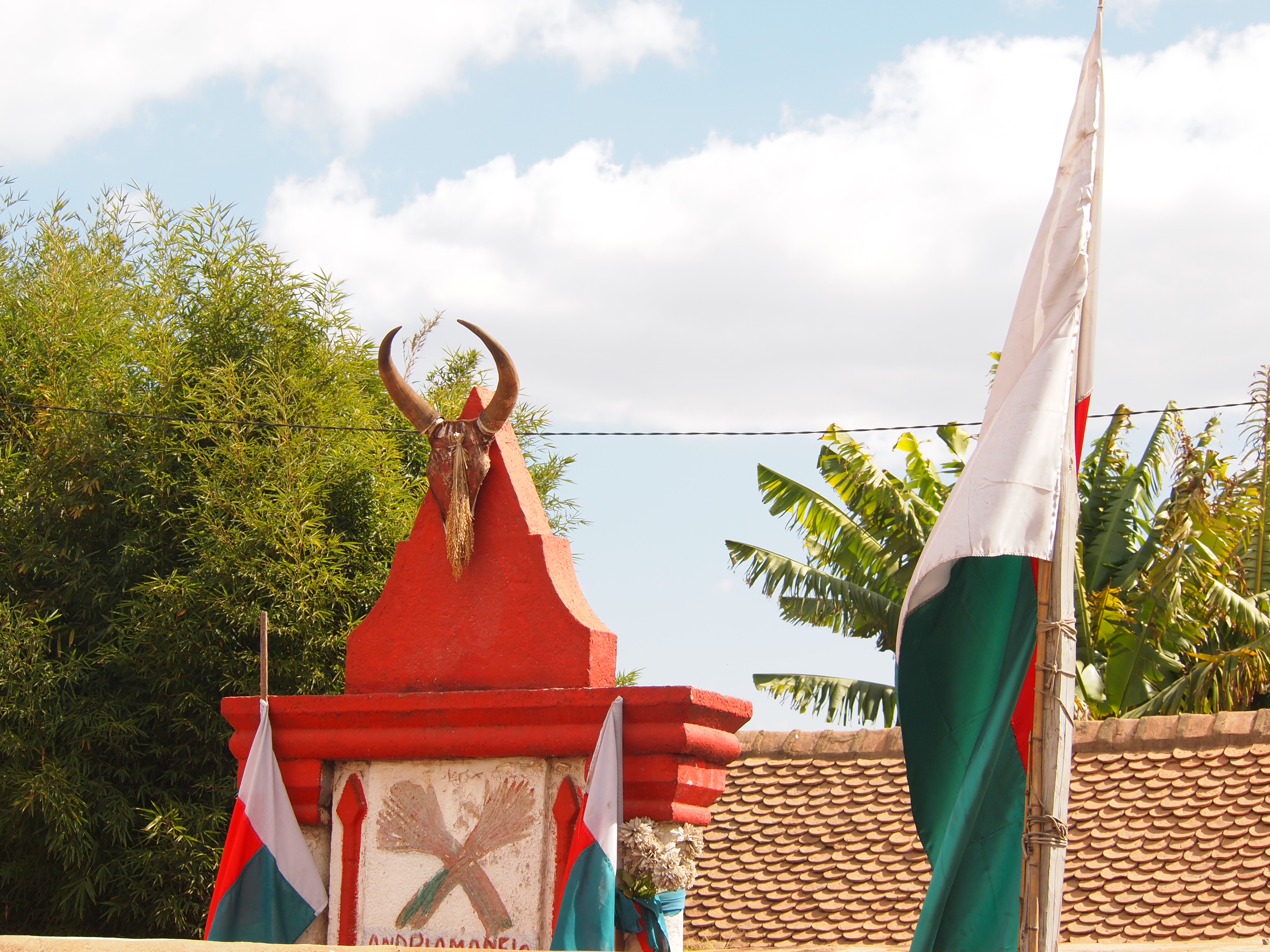
Tomb of Andriamanelo in Alasora

Andriamanelo ruled until his death at an advanced age around 1575 and was succeeded by his only surviving son, Ralambo. He was buried in Alasora in an earthen ditch. According to oral tradition, the placement of his tomb may have been to the south-east of the royal compound rather than to the north as was customary. This anomaly may have been intended to symbolically indicate Andriamanelo's "otherness" as a man of mixed ethnic background. A similar tomb to the north of the Alasora compound may have been that of Andriamanelo's mother. These two earthen tombs are considered the oldest known royal-style tombs in Imerina.

== Bibliography ==
- Callet, François (1972) [1908]. Tantara ny andriana eto Madagasikara (histoire des rois) (in French). Antananarivo: Imprimerie catholique.
- Kent, Raymond (1970). Early Kingdoms in Madagascar and the Birth of the Sakalava Empire, 1500–1700, Volume 1. Madison WI: Holt, Rinehart and Winston.
- Kus, Susan (1982). "Matters Material and Ideal". In Hodder, Ian (ed.). Symbolic and Structural Archaeology. New York: Cambridge University Press. ISBN 978-0-521-24406-0.
- Miller, Daniel; Rowlands, Michael (1989). Domination and Resistance. London: Routledge. ISBN 978-0-415-12254-2.
- Ogot, Bethwell A. (1992). Africa from the Sixteenth to the Eighteenth Century (in French). Paris: UNESCO. ISBN 978-0-520-06700-4.
- Piolet, Jean-Baptiste (1895). Madagascar et les Hova: déscription, organisation, histoire (in French). Paris: C. Delagrave.
- Radimilahy, Chantal (1993). "Ancient Iron-working in Madagascar". In Shaw, Thurstan (ed.). The Archaeology of Africa: Food, Metals and Towns. London: Taylor & Francis. ISBN 978-0-415-11585-8.
- Rafidinarivo, Christiane (2009). Empreintes de la servitude dans les sociétés de l'océan Indien: métamorphoses et permanences (in French). Paris: Karthala Editions. ISBN 978-2-8111-0276-0.
- Raison-Jourde, Françoise (1983). Les souverains de Madagascar (in French). Paris: Karthala Editions. ISBN 978-2-86537-059-7.
- de la Vaissière, Camille; Abinal, Antoine (1885). Vingt ans à Madagascar: colonisation, traditions historiques, moeurs et croyances (in French). Paris: V. Lecoffre. ISBN 3-540-63293-X.
- You, André (1905). Madagascar, histoire, organisation, colonisation (in French). Paris: Berger-Levrault & cie.
