= Andriana =

Historical noble class and title in Madagascar

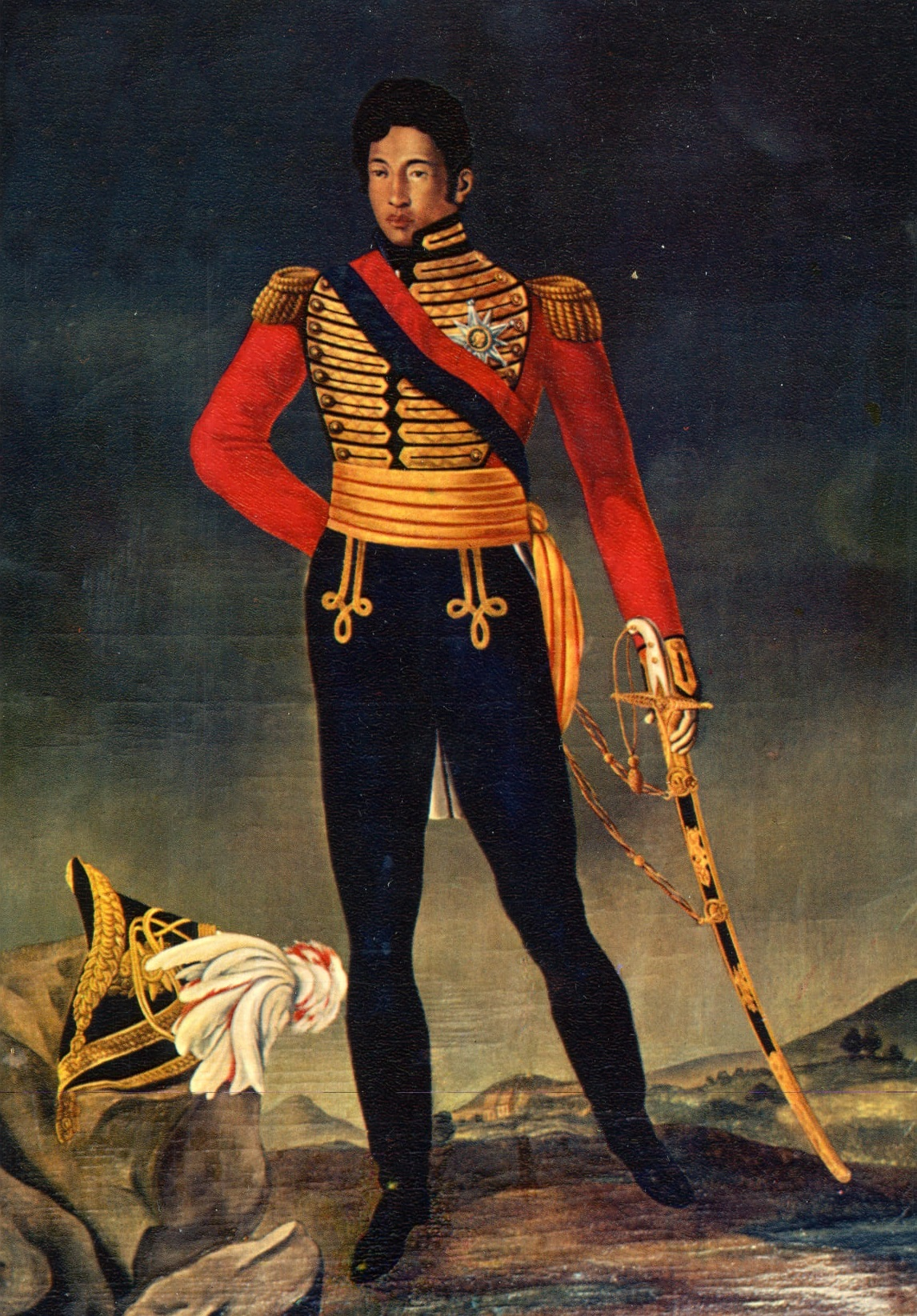
Radama I was from the Andriana strata of Merina people.

Andriana (Malagasy pronunciation: [ˈanˌɖʐianə̥]) was both the noble class and a title of nobility in Madagascar. Historically, many Malagasy ethnic groups lived in highly stratified caste-based social orders in which the Andriana were the highest strata. They were above the Hova (free commoner castes) and Andevo (slaves).

The Andriana strata originally constituted the Merina society's nobility, warrior, and land-owning class. They were endogamous, and their privileges were institutionally preserved. While the term and concept of Andriana is associated with the Merina people of Madagascar, the term is not limited to them. The use of the word "Andriana" to denote nobility occurs among numerous other Malagasy ethnic groups such as the Betsileo, the Betsimisaraka, the Tsimihety, the Bezanozano, the Antambahoaka, and the Antemoro. "Andriana" often traditionally formed part of the names of Malagasy kings, princes, and nobles. Linguistic evidence suggests its origin is traceable back to an ancient Javanese nobility title, although alternate theories have been proposed.

== Etymology ==
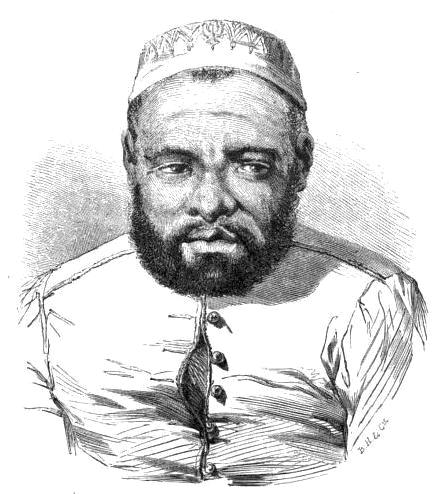
Andriana is a prefix for the noble strata in many Malagasy ethnic groups, such as Andriantsoly (above) of Sakalava people.

In Malagasy, the term became Rohandryan and later Roandriana, mainly used in the Southeastern part of the island among the Zafiraminia, Antemoro, and Antambahoaka ethnic groups. In the central Highlands, among the Merina, Betsileo, Bezanozano, and Sihanaka, the term became Randryan and later Randriana or simply Andriana.

Other proposed etymologies for Andriana includes the root Handrina, which means "head or forehead" in Malagasy.

In Madagascar, the name of a Malagasy sovereign, prince, or nobleman was often historically composed by placing "Andriana" as a prefix to the remainder of the name. For example, the name of Merina king Andrianampoinimerina is a composite of "Andriana" and "Nampoinimerina", while that of the celebrated Sakalava warrior Andriamisara is formed from "Andriana" and "Misara".

In Madagascar today, names beginning with the "Andria" prefix are common. However, unlike in Western cultures, where children automatically inherit the family name of a parent, Malagasy parents are free to choose their child's first and last names as they please. Following the end of the monarchy in Imerina, many parents have chosen to give their children names that include the "Andriana" prefix, despite lacking any family connection to the former aristocracy.

== History ==
Austronesian people settled in Madagascar between 200 and 500 CE, arriving by boat from various Southeast Asian regions. Mainland Africans began migrating to the island by the 9th century. Portuguese traders were the first Europeans to arrive in the 15th century, soon followed by other European powers. Andriana in the southeast of the island claim descent from a legendary figure called Darafify.

This influx of diverse people led to various Malagasy sub-ethnicities by the mid-2nd millennium. The Merina were probably the early arrivals, though this is uncertain, and other ethnic groups on Madagascar consider them relative newcomers to the island. The Merina people's culture likely mixed with the Madagascar natives named Vazimba, about whom little is known. According to the island's oral traditions, the "most Austronesian looking" Merina people reached the interior of the island in the 15th century. They established their society there because of wars and migrant pressure at the coast. Merina people were settled in the central Madagascar and formed one of the three major kingdoms on the island by the 18th century, the other two being the Swahili-Arab influenced Sakalava kingdom in the northwest and the Austronesian Betsimisaraka kingdom in the northeast.

The term Hova originally applied to all members of the Merina people who arrived in the central highlands around the 15th century and absorbed the existing population of Vazimba. Andriamanelo (1540–1575) consolidated the power of the Hova when he united many of the Hova chiefdoms under his rule. The term Hova remained in use through the 20th century. However, some foreigners transliterated that word to be Ankova.

Beginning in the 16th century, slaves were brought into Madagascar's various kingdoms, and social strata emerged in Merina kingdom. The Hova emerged as the free commoners' caste below the noble's hierarchy. During the rule of King Andriamanelo, a subset of Hova related to the king by blood gained the title Andriana.

=== Sub-castes among the Merina ===
King Andriamanelo is credited with establishing the Andriana as a separate class in early Merina society. This class was subdivided into four groups by his son, the King Ralambo (1575–1600):

- Andriantompokoindrindra, the Eldest son of King Ralambo and his direct descendants
- Andrianamboninolona, the son of Andriamananitany, brother of King Andriamanelo, and his direct descendants
- Andriandranando, the uncle of the King Ralambo and his direct descendants
- Zanadralambo amin'Andrianjaka, the other sons of the King Ralambo

The descendants of these three princes (Andriantompokoindrindra, Andrianamboninolona and Andriandranando) were called Andrianteloray.

The caste was further divided into six groups by Ralambo's great-great-grandson King Andriamasinavalona (1675–1710), based on locality and genealogical proximity to the ruling family. The Andriana class was divided again into seven groups by King Andrianampoinimerina (1778–1810). In rank order, these groups were:

- Zazamarolahy (or Marolahy): Direct male descendants of the sovereign; it was from the small, elite sub-group called the Zanakandriana that the next ruler was selected
- Andriamasinavalona: Noble descendants of the four sons of King Andriamasinavalona who were not assigned to rule one of the four sub-divisions of Imerina that had been made the fiefs of his other four sons
- Andriantompokoindrindra: Descendants of Andriantompokoindrindra, the eldest son of King Ralambo
- Andrianamboninolona ("Princes Above the People") or Zanakambony ("Sons Above"): Descendants of those who accompanied King Andrianjaka on his conquest of Antananarivo
- Andriandranando (or Zafinandriandranando): Descendants of the uncle of King Ralambo
- Zanadralambo amin'Andrianjaka: Descendants of Ralambo's other children who did not accede to the throne

=== Occupations and privileges ===
The Andriana caste was originally the source of nobility, and specialized in the rituals and warrior occupations in the Merina society. In the 19th century, when Merina conquered the other kingdoms and ruled most of the island, a much larger army was needed; soldiers in this time were drawn from the Hova caste as well.

The Andriana benefited from numerous privileges in precolonial Madagascar. Land ownership in Imerina was reserved for the Andriana class, who ruled over fiefs called menakely. The populace under the rule of an Andriana lord owed him, as well as the king, a certain amount of free labor each year (fanompoana) for public works such as the construction of dikes, rice paddies, roads and town walls. Posts of privilege within the government, such as judges or royal advisers, were likewise reserved for certain groups of Andriana.

The valiha, the national instrument of Madagascar, was originally played by all classes of society, but became affiliated with the noble class in the 19th century. The valiha featured heavily in the music of the Merina royal court performed at palaces such as Ambohimanga or the Rova at Antananarivo. The strings of the valiha were more easily plucked with the fingernails, which were commonly grown long for this purpose; long fingernails became fashionable and symbolic of belonging to the Andriana class within the Kingdom of Imerina.

At Antananarivo, only Andriana tombs were allowed to be constructed within town limits. Hovas (freemen) and slaves were required to bury their dead beyond the city walls. The highest ranks of Andriana were permitted to distinguish their tombs by the construction of a small, windowless wooden tomb house on top of it, called a trano masina (sacred house) for the king and trano manara (cold house) for the Zanakandriana, Zazamarolahy and Andriamasinavalona. This tradition may have originated with King Andriantompokoindrindra, who is said to have ordered the first trano masina to be built on his tomb in honor of his memory.

=== Marriage ===
Andriana were also subjected to certain restrictions. Marriage outside the caste was forbidden by law among the lowest three ranks of Andriana. A high-ranking woman who married a lower-ranking man would take on her husband's lower rank. Although the inverse situation would not cause a high-ranking man to lose status, he could not transfer his rank or property to his children. For these reasons, intermarriage across Andriana caste divisions was relatively infrequent.

The Andriana, the Hova, and the Andevo strata were endogamous in the Merina society. According to the colonial era missionary William Ellis's memoir of 1838, an Andriana in the Malagasy society was prohibited from marrying a Hova or an Andevo. The exception, stated Ellis, was the unmarried Queen, who could marry anyone from any strata including the Hova, and her children were deemed to be royal. In contrast, Sandra Evers states that the social taboo on intermarriage was weaker between the Andriana and Hova, but remained strong between Andriana and Andevo. The social mores and restrictions on inter-marriage between social strata were historically present among other Malagasy ethnic groups.

== Contemporary society ==
The Andriana, along with the other castes, played an important part in the independence of Madagascar. For instance, Joseph Ravoahangy-Andrianavalona, a Merina nationalist and deputy, was an Andriana of the Andriamasinavalona sub-caste. The secret nationalist organization V.V.S. (Vy Vato Sakelika) was composed of some Andriana of the intelligentsia. A 1968 study showed that 14% of the population of Imerina was Andriana.

The Andriana have been key players in Madagascan political and cultural life after independence as well. The Andriana were deeply affected by the 1995 destruction of the royal palace, the Rova, in Antananarivo. Their approval and participation were periodically solicited throughout the reconstruction process.

In 2011, the Council of Kings and Princes of Madagascar promoted the revival of a Christian Andriana monarchy that would blend modernity and tradition.

== Genealogy: Tantara ny Andriana ==
Much of the known genealogical history of the Andriana of Imerina comes from Father François Callet's book Tantara ny Andriana eto Madagasikara ("History of the Nobles"). This collection of oral tradition about the history of the Merina Dynasty was originally written in Malagasy and published between 1878 and 1881. Callet summarized and translated it in French under the title Tantara ny Andriana (Histoire des rois) in 1908. Tantara ny Andriana constitutes the core material for the historians studying the Merina history and has been commented, criticised, and challenged ever since by historians from Madagascar, Europe, and North America. For examples, refer to Rasamimanana (1930), Ravelojaona et al. (1937), Ramilison (1951), Kent (1970), Berg (1988), or Larson (2000). The work is complemented by oral traditions of other tribes collected by Malagasy historians.

== Andriana gallery ==
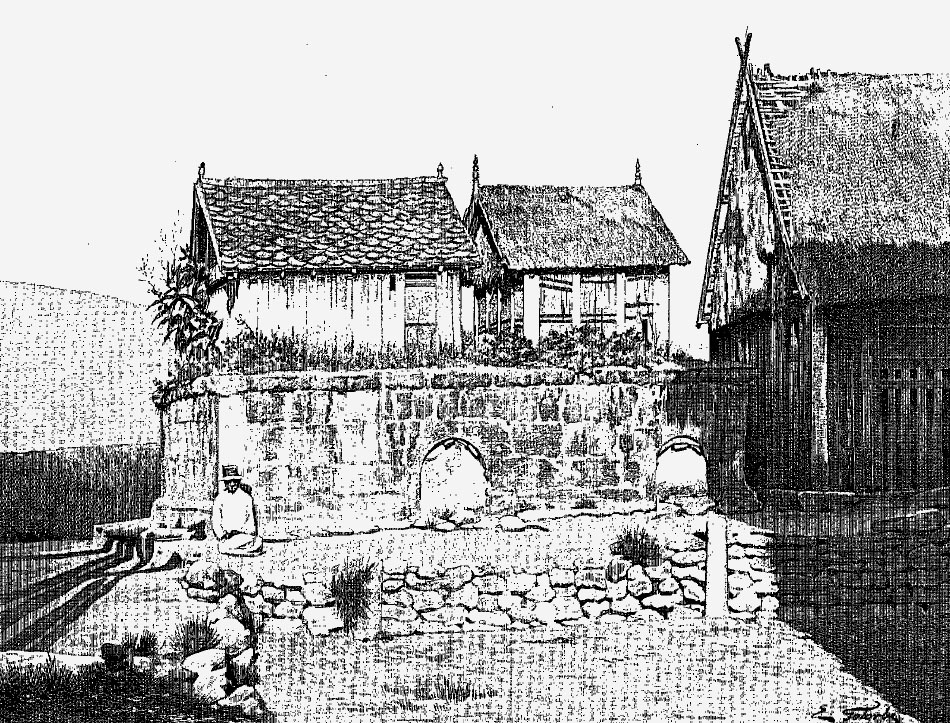
Ancient Andriana tomb with trano manara or trano masina

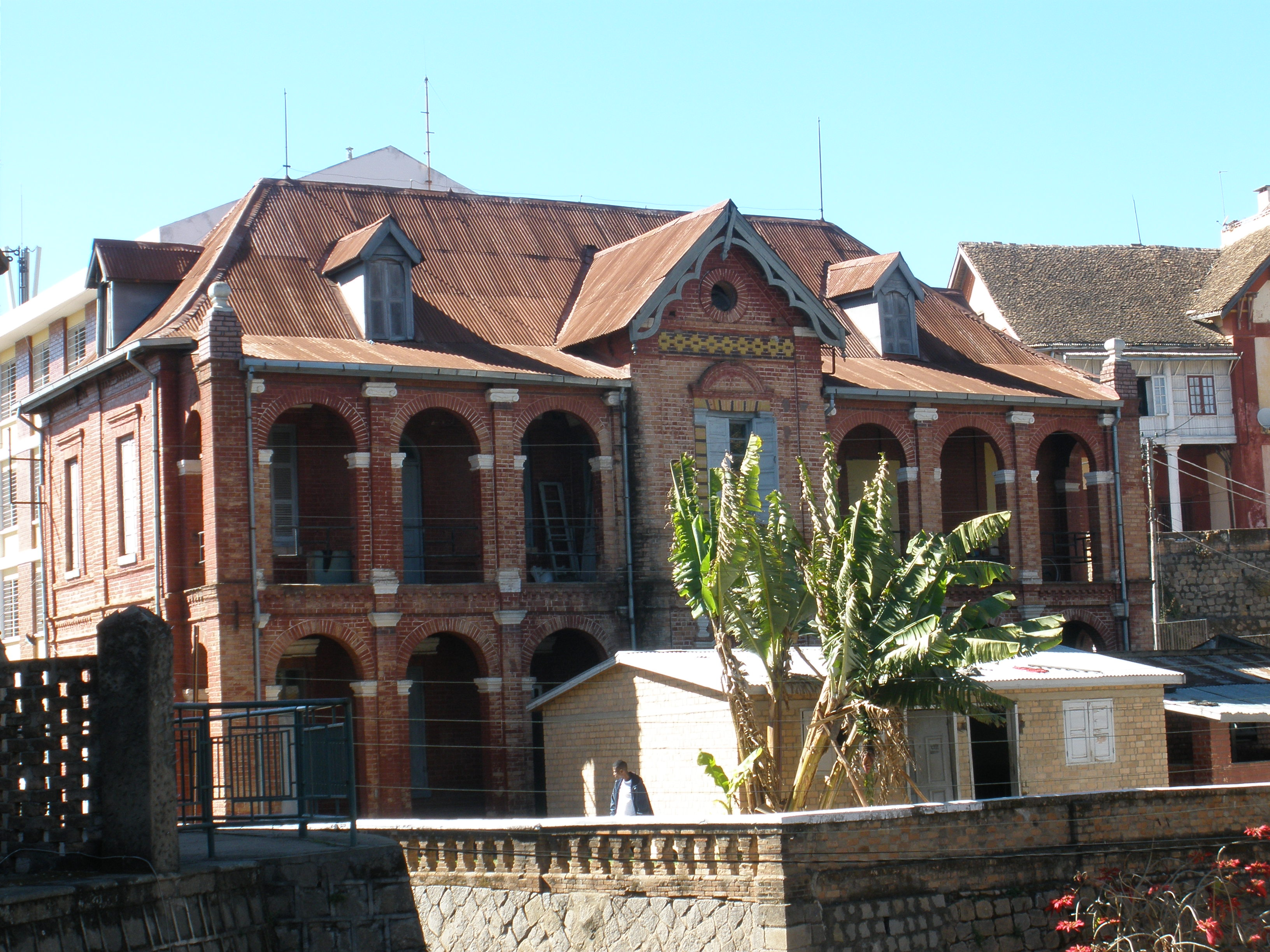
The former Ratsimamanga palace in Antananarivo once belonged to a great Andriana family

== See also ==
- History of Madagascar
- History of the Merinas
- History of the Betsileos
- History of the Sakalavas
- List of Malagasy monarchs
