= Rafohy =

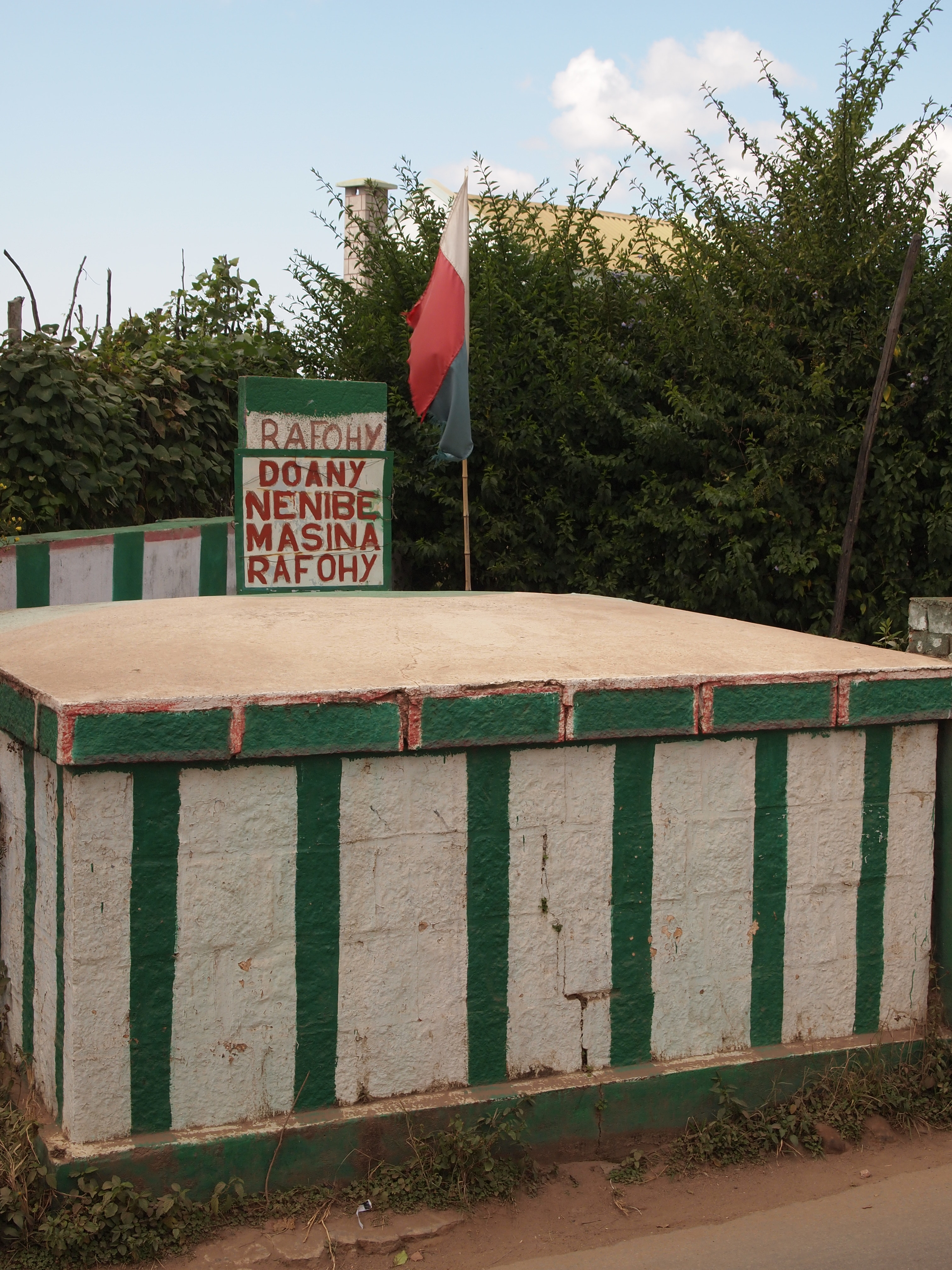
- Symbolic tomb of Rafohy in Alasora

Queen of Alasora
- Reign: 1530–1540
- Predecessor: Rangita
- Successor: Andriamanelo
- Died: 1540; Alasora, Madagascar
- Dynasty: Hova dynasty

Queen Rafohy (died 1540) was a Vazimba queen who ruled at Alasora in the central Highlands of Madagascar from 1530 until her death in 1540. Her name means "The Short One."

She succeeded upon the death of Vazimba Queen Rangita, who by different accounts was either her mother or her adoptive sister. This confusion in the oral tradition extends to the two women's very identities - according to different accounts, Rafohy may have been the mother of Rangita, and Rangita may have been the mother of the famed king Andriamanelo.

During Rahofy's reign, Merina influence grew. Her capital was Alisora.

The mother of Andriamanelo (Rafohy or Rangita) married twice: while her first marriage eventually produced one son, the second marriage with a Merina named Manelobe produced a daughter and her eldest son whom she designated to succeed her upon her death. Such a succession was a change from the traditional method, wherein kingdom was split between children. This designated heir, King Andriamanelo (1540–1575) became the first King of Imerina by ultimately turning against the Vazimba and leading a military conquest that would drive them from the Highlands.

In accordance with vazimba custom wherein the bodies of the dead were submerged in sacred bodies of water - occasionally after being placed within coffins made from hollowed-out logs - it is said that upon Rafohy's death, her body (like that of Rangita) was submerged in a bog within a silver coffin shaped like an outrigger canoe.

Regnal titles
Preceded by Rangita	Queen of Alasora; 1530–1540	Succeeded by Andriamanelo
