= Ambohimanga =

Traditional fortified royal settlement (rova) in Madagascar

UNESCO World Heritage Site
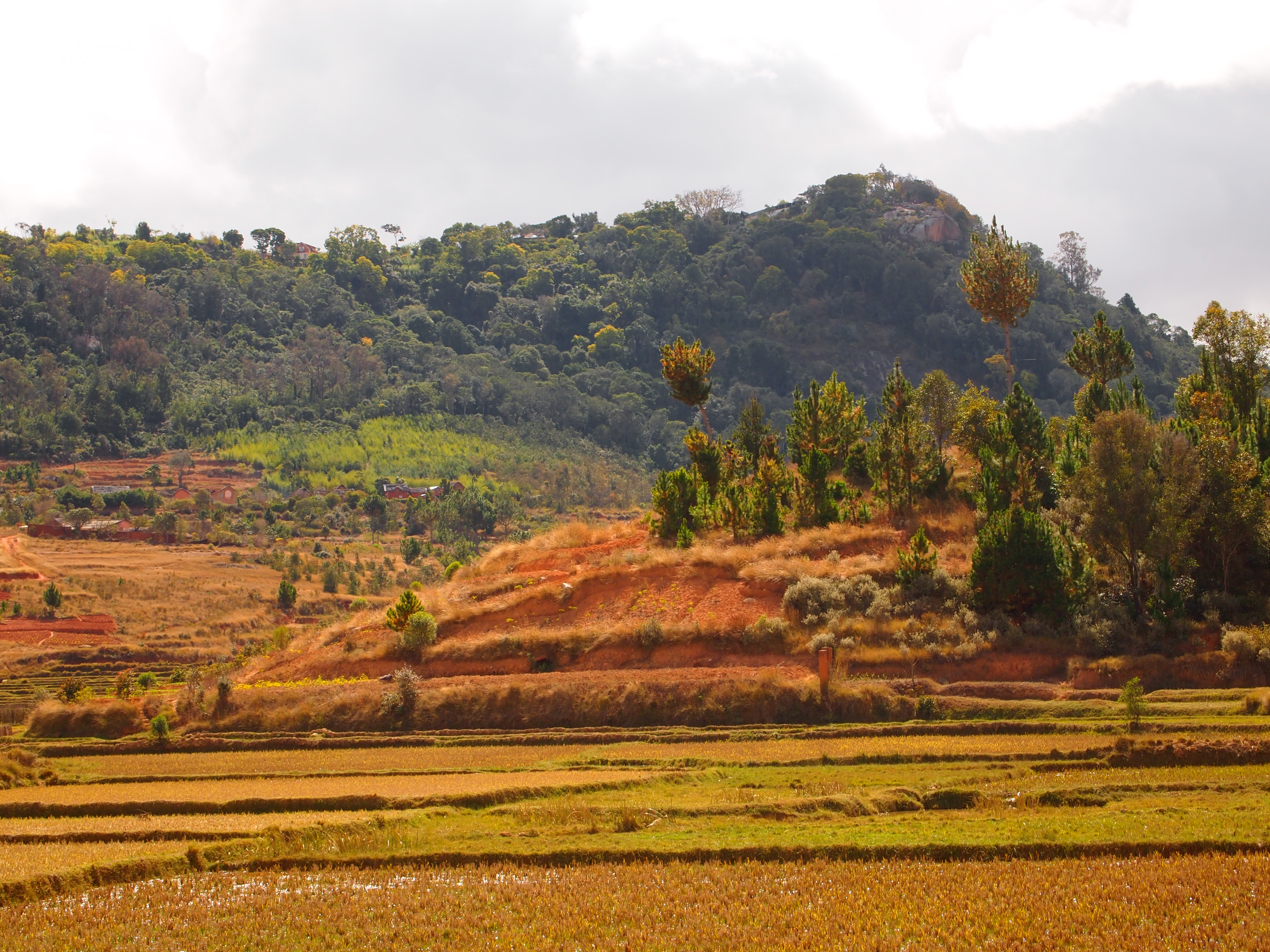
- View of Ambohimanga

- Location within Madagascar
- Official name: Royal Hill of Ambohimanga
- Location: Madagascar
- Criteria: Cultural: (iii), (iv), (vi)
- Reference: 950
- Inscription: 2001 (25th Session)
- Area: 59 ha (0.23 sq mi)
- Buffer zone: 425 ha (1.64 sq mi)
- Coordinates: 18°45′33″S 47°33′46″E

Ambohimanga is a hill and traditional fortified royal settlement (rova) in Madagascar, located approximately 24 kilometers (15 mi) northeast of the capital city of Antananarivo. It is situated in the commune of Ambohimanga Rova.

The hill and the rova that stands on top are considered the most significant symbol of the cultural identity of the Merina people and the most important and best-preserved monument of the precolonial Merina Kingdom. The walled historic village includes residences and burial sites of several key monarchs. The site, one of the twelve sacred hills of Imerina, is associated with strong feelings of national identity and has maintained its spiritual and sacred character both in ritual practice and the popular imagination for at least four hundred years. It remains a place of worship to which pilgrims come from Madagascar and elsewhere.

The site has been politically important since the early 18th century, when King Andriamasinavalona (1675–1710) divided the Kingdom of Imerina into four quadrants and assigned his son Andriantsimitoviaminiandriana to govern the northeastern quadrant, Avaradrano, from its newly designated capital at Ambohimanga. The division of Imerina led to 77 years of civil war, during which time the successive rulers of Avaradrano led military campaigns to expand their territory while undertaking modifications to the defenses at Ambohimanga to better protect it against attacks. The war was ended from Ambohimanga by King Andrianampoinimerina, who successfully undertook negotiations and military campaigns that reunited Imerina under his rule by 1793. Upon capturing the historic capital of Imerina at Antananarivo, Andrianampoinimerina shifted his royal court and all political functions back to its original locus at Antananarivo's royal compound and declared the two cities of equal importance, with Ambohimanga as the kingdom's spiritual capital. He and later rulers in his line continued to conduct royal rituals at the site and regularly inhabited and remodeled Ambohimanga until French colonization of the kingdom and the exile of the royal family in 1897. The significance of historical events here and the presence of royal tombs have given the hill a sacred character that is further enhanced at Ambohimanga by the burial sites of several Vazimba, the island's earliest inhabitants.

The royal compound on the hilltop is surrounded by a complex system of defensive ditches and stone walls and is accessed by 14 gateways, of which many were sealed by stone disc barriers. The gateways and construction of buildings within the compound are arranged according to two overlaid cosmological systems that value the four cardinal points radiating from a unifying center, and attach sacred importance to the northeastern direction. The complex inside the wall is subdivided into three smaller rova. Mahandrihono, the largest compound, was established between 1710 and 1730 by King Andriambelomasina; it remains largely intact and contains the royal tombs, house of King Andrianampoinimerina, summer palace of Queen Ranavalona II, and sites that figured in key royal rituals such as the sacrificial zebu pen, royal bath and main courtyard. Original buildings no longer remain in the compound of Bevato, established before 1710 by Andriamborona, and the Nanjakana compound, built for King Andrianjafy in the late 18th century. The hill and its royal fortified city were added to the list of UNESCO World Heritage Sites in 2001 and represent Madagascar's only cultural site following the destruction by fire in 1995 of its historic sister city, the Rova of Antananarivo, shortly before the latter's intended inscription to the list. Numerous governmental and civil society organizations support the conservation of Ambohimanga by restoring damaged features and preventing further degradation.

== Etymology ==
The name Ambohimanga is a noun-adjective compound in the standard Malagasy language composed of two parts: ambohi, meaning "hill", and manga, which can mean "sacred", "blue", "beautiful" or "good". The earliest known name for the hill was Tsimadilo. It was renamed Ambohitrakanga ("hill of the guinea fowls") around 1700 by a dethroned prince named Andriamborona who, according to oral history, was the first to settle on the hilltop with his family. The hill received its current name from King Andriamasinavalona in the early 18th century.

== History ==
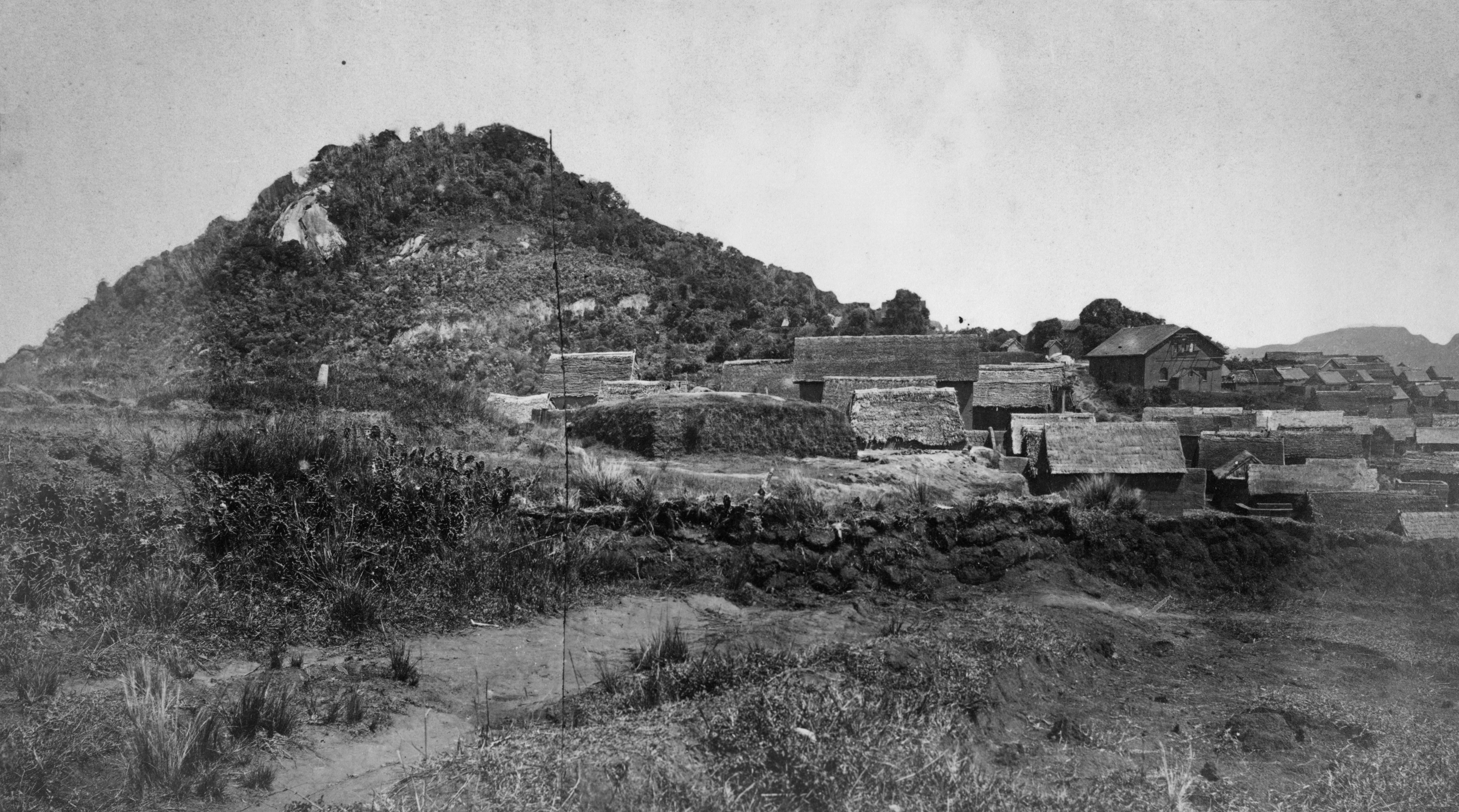
Ambohimanga, 1865

Madagascar's central highlands, including the area around Ambohimanga, were first inhabited between 200 BCE–300 CE by the island's earliest settlers, the Vazimba, who appear to have arrived by pirogue from southeastern Borneo to establish simple villages in the island's dense forests. By the 15th century the Merina ethnic group from the southeastern coast had gradually migrated into the central highlands where they established hilltop villages interspersed among the existing Vazimba settlements, which were ruled by local kings. The tombs of at least four Vazimba are located on or around Ambohimanga hill and are sites of pilgrimage, including the tombs of Ingorikelisahiloza, Andriantsidonina, Ramomba and Kotosarotra. In the mid-16th century the disparate Merina principalities were united as the Kingdom of Imerina under the rule of King Andriamanelo (1540–1575), who initiated military campaigns to expel or assimilate the Vazimba population. Conflict with the Vazimba led Andriamanelo to fortify his hill town using earthen walls, stone gateways and deep defensive trenches. This fortified town model, called a rova, was propagated by the noble class throughout Imerina until French colonization of Madagascar in 1895.

The earliest settlement at the height of Ambohimanga was most likely established in the 15th century, coinciding with the arrival of the Merina in the highlands. Rice paddies took the place of the original valley forests by the 16th century, and the growing population near the valleys around Ambohimanga became known by the clan name Tantsaha ("people of the cultivated land"). According to oral history, however, the first to settle the site of the Ambohimanga rova was Andriamborona, the dethroned prince of the highland territory of Imamo, who relocated to the then-unpopulated hilltop in around 1700 accompanied by his nephew, his wife, and his mother, Ratompobe. Merina king Andriamasinavalona (1675–1710), who reigned over Imerina from his royal compound in Antananarivo, noticed a bonfire lit by the family on the southern face of the hill 24 kilometers away. The visibility of the site from his capital led Andriamasinavalona to desire Ambohimanga as a residence for his son, Andriantsimitoviaminiandriana. Andriamborona and his family agreed to shift three times to different parts of the hill, including the future site of the royal compound of Bevato, in response to consecutive requests from the king. For a short time he and the prince lived in neighboring houses at Bevato before Andriamborona and his family finally left the hill for the distant highland village of Ambatolampy, where he lived the rest of his life; the king retrieved their bodies for burial at Ambohimanga.

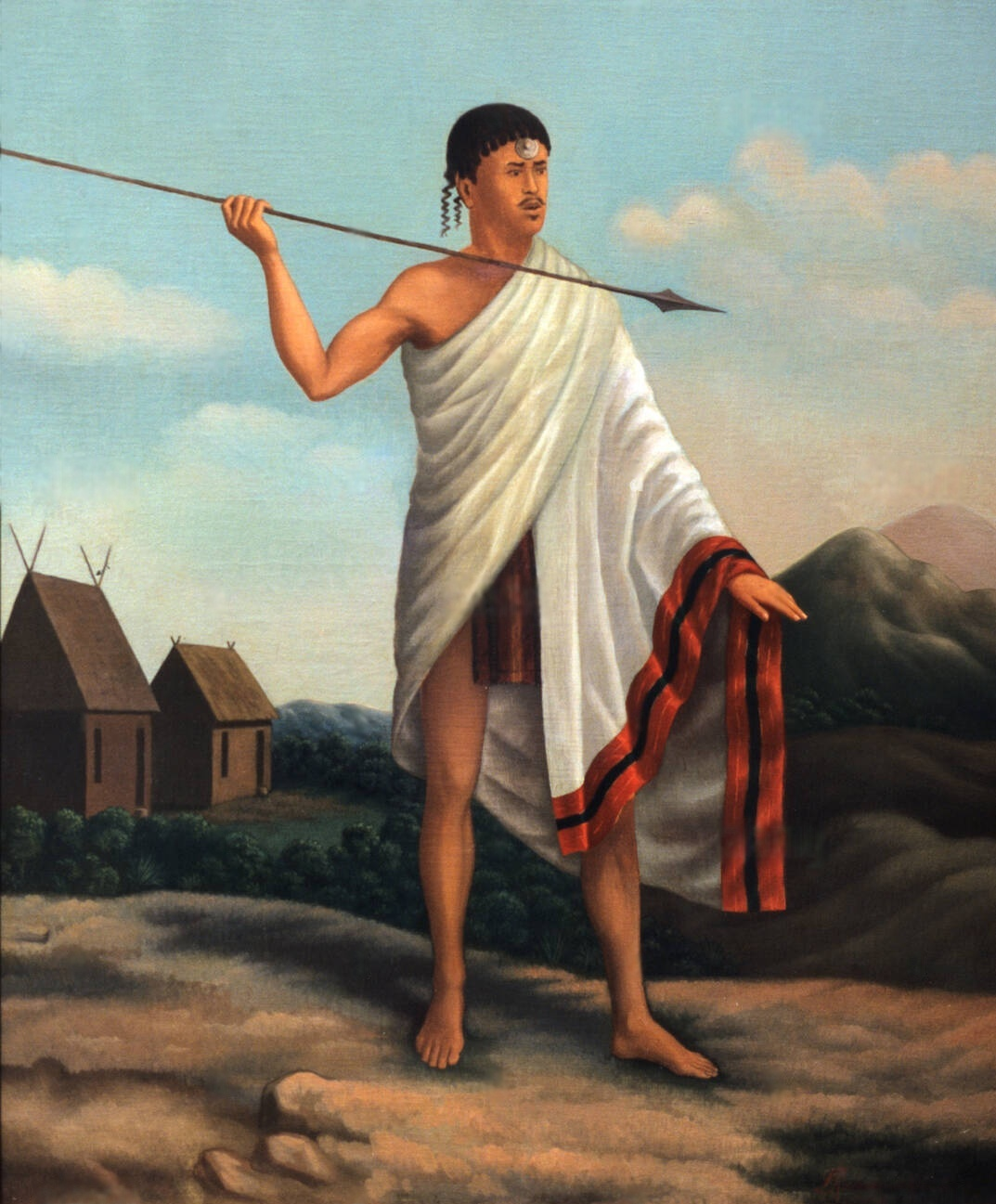
Ambohimanga was the launching point of King Andrianampoinimerina's successful military campaign to reunify Imerina after 77 years of civil war.

In 1710, Andriamasinavalona divided the Kingdom of Imerina into four quadrants, which were given to his four favorite sons to rule. Andriantsimitoviaminiandriana received the eastern quadrant, Avaradrano, and transformed his rova at Ambohimanga into its capital. As the first king of Avaradrano (1710–1730), Andriantsimitoviaminiandriana also built the site's defensive walls and its first set of seven gates. Rather than rule their respective territories peacefully as Andriamasinavalona had intended, his four sons began a series of wars to seize control of neighboring territory, causing famine and suffering among the peasant population of Imerina. Andriantsimitoviaminiandriana spent much of his reign strengthening the authority of his governance at Ambohimanga and attracting residents to settle in the surrounding villages while battling his brothers to increase the land under his control. He was succeeded by his adopted son, Andriambelomasina (1730–1770), who continued to rule Avaradrano from Ambohimanga in the Mahandrihono compound he built beside the original compound of Besakana. Andriambelomasina significantly expanded Ambohimanga and strengthened its defenses, enabling him to successfully repel an attack against the rova by a band of Sakalava warriors employed by his chief rival, the ruler of Antananarivo. He named as his successor his eldest son, Andrianjafy (1770–1787), and designated his grandson Andrianampoinimerina to follow Andrianjafy in the order of succession. Andrianjafy, a weak and unjust ruler, maintained his capital at Ambohimanga where he built a new private compound called Nanjakana, but often resided in the nearby village of Ilafy.

Andrianampoinimerina dethroned Andrianjafy in a violent conflict that ended in 1787. The king then used Ambohimanga as a launching point for a successful campaign to bring the twelve sacred hills of Imerina under his rule, including the hill city of Antananarivo, thereby reuniting the four quadrants of the divided Kingdom of Imerina under his sovereignty and putting an end to 77 years of civil war. To consolidate support for his rule, Andrianampoinimerina mobilized representatives of the numerous noble castes to participate in the most extensive effort yet to expand and fortify Ambohimanga. He ordered the construction of new city walls, gates and defensive trenches, as well as a rosewood palace called Mahandrihono, which he had built in the traditional style.

"Ambohimanga is the source of all goodness
Antananarivo, the vessel that stores it
Ambohimanga gave birth to our kings
Antananarivo, the city that united their people
Ambohimanga has love in abundance
Antananarivo, the pleasures of the world"

— Traditional folk song

Following the conquest of Antananarivo in 1793, Andrianampoinimerina shifted the political capital of Imerina from Ambohimanga to its original site at Antananarivo, while pronouncing Ambohimanga the kingdom's spiritual capital. Important traditional rituals continued to be held at Ambohimanga, and Andrianampoinimerina regularly stayed in its Mahandrihono palace. His son, Radama I, inhabited Ambohimanga's Nanjakana compound as a youth before relocating to Antananarivo, and visited Ambohimanga frequently after the move. Radama's widow and successor, Ranavalona I, renovated the Mahandrihono compound and moved several buildings from the sister rova at Antananarivo to Ambohimanga. She also forbade swine at Ambohimanga due to their association with Europeans, who had propagated pork as a food source in the decade prior. Subsequent queens made their own mark on the site, including the reconstruction of Nanjakana by Rasoherina, and Ranavalona II's addition of two large pavilions to the Mahandrihono compound that reflected a syncretism of traditional and Western architectural styles.

Throughout much of the 19th century and particularly under the reign of Queen Ranavalona I (1828–1861), Ambohimanga was forbidden to visiting foreigners, contributing to its mystique as a "forbidden city". This status remained until 1897 when the French colonial administration transferred all the relics and significant belongings of the royal family from Ambohimanga to Antananarivo to break the spirit of resistance and ethnic identity that these symbols inspired in the Malagasy people, particularly in the highlands. In the early 20th century, the area was further changed when the French removed the sacred forests remaining on the neighboring hilltops in the early 20th century. The city nonetheless retains its symbolic significance in Imerina to this day.

== Layout ==
Ambohimanga is located in the central highlands of Madagascar, approximately 24 kilometers (15 mi) northeast of the capital city of Antananarivo. The hill rises steeply approximately 450 feet from the surrounding terrain on its eastern side and gradually slopes downward toward the west. The royal city of the same name, situated at the peak of the hill, has panoramic views of the surrounding hills and valleys, and is surrounded on the hill's slopes and the valley floor by the houses of residents of Ambohimanga village. The terraced rice paddies that cover the hillsides to the north and south of the royal city were created in the 17th and 18th centuries to provide a staple food source to the inhabitants of the hill and its surrounding villages. The crest of Ambohimanga is higher than the surrounding hills and others among the traditionally designated twelve sacred hills of Imerina, symbolically indicative of the site's political significance relative to other similar hill towns. This elevation also offered an excellent vantage point for surveying the surrounding areas for advancing enemy troops. Rising from among the surrounding valleys and terraced rice paddies, the hill is topped with a forest that was exempted from the widespread deforestation of the highlands due to its sacred nature. The UNESCO World Heritage Site encompassing the hill and the royal city at its peak extends over a surface area of 59 hectares, with a buffer zone of 425 hectares.

=== Symbolism ===
The layout of Ambohimanga's three compounds and the structures within them followed a traditional design established by the earliest Merina highland settlers by the 15th century. According to custom, a rova could only be established by an andriana (noble). Its foundation was built to raise the rova higher than the surrounding buildings outside its walls. Contained within the rova was at least one lapa (royal palace or residence) as well as the fasana (tomb) of one or more of the site's founders and family members. It also enclosed a kianja (courtyard) marked by a vatomasina (sacred stone) that elevated the sovereign above the people for the delivery of kabary (royal speeches or decrees). The sovereign's lodgings typically stood in the northern part of the rova, while the spouse or spouses lived in the southern part.

At Ambohimanga, as in other rova sites, the cardinal and vertical layout of these various traditional components embodies two cosmological notions of space that coexisted in traditional Imerina. The older system governed sociopolitical order and was based on the concept of the four cardinal points radiating from a unifying center. A more recent system introduced through the astrology of seafaring Arabs governed the spiritual order and placed special significance on the northeast. The sacred eastern portions of Ambohimanga contained structures associated with the veneration of the ancestors, including the royal tombs, basins of holy water used in royal rituals, and numerous Ficus and Draceana trees, which were symbolic of royalty. The northern portion of the site is the location of a courtyard where royal judgments were handed down from atop a prominent granite boulder, in line with the Malagasy association between the northern cardinal point, masculinity, and political power. The houses of the royal wives were formerly located in the southern portion of the site, a cardinal point traditionally associated with femininity and spiritual power. These competing cosmological systems are also reflected in the placement of the city's main gates at cardinal points, as well as the northeastern gates reserved for use by the sovereign and dedicated to their role in sacred rituals.

The orientation and placement of many structures within Ambohimanga were copied from Ambohimanga's older twin city, the rova at Antananarivo, which likewise embodies both traditional notions of space. The placement of the city of Ambohimanga relative to Antananarivo also reflects these systems. Centrally located Antananarivo is the nation's political capital today, and Ambohimanga to its northeast is regarded as the spiritual capital.

Between these two systems, that of the political order predominates in the layout of Ambohimanga, and the sacredness of the city was historically more explicitly associated with its role as a political rather than an astrological center. The forbidding of foreigners from the site in the 19th century, for instance, was enacted to preserve the sanctity of the social and political order, rather than the religious order. By respecting these systems of symbolism, successive rulers sought to ensure the benediction of the ancestors, strengthen the legitimacy of their rule and ensure the protection and stability of their kingdom. However, adherence to cardinal division and symbolism of space is weaker at Ambohimanga than its embodiment of the significance of vertical space and elevation as an indicator of rank. The site of each new compound within the royal city was selected less for its cardinal direction than for the extent to which it was located on higher ground than the compound that predated it.

=== Fortifications ===
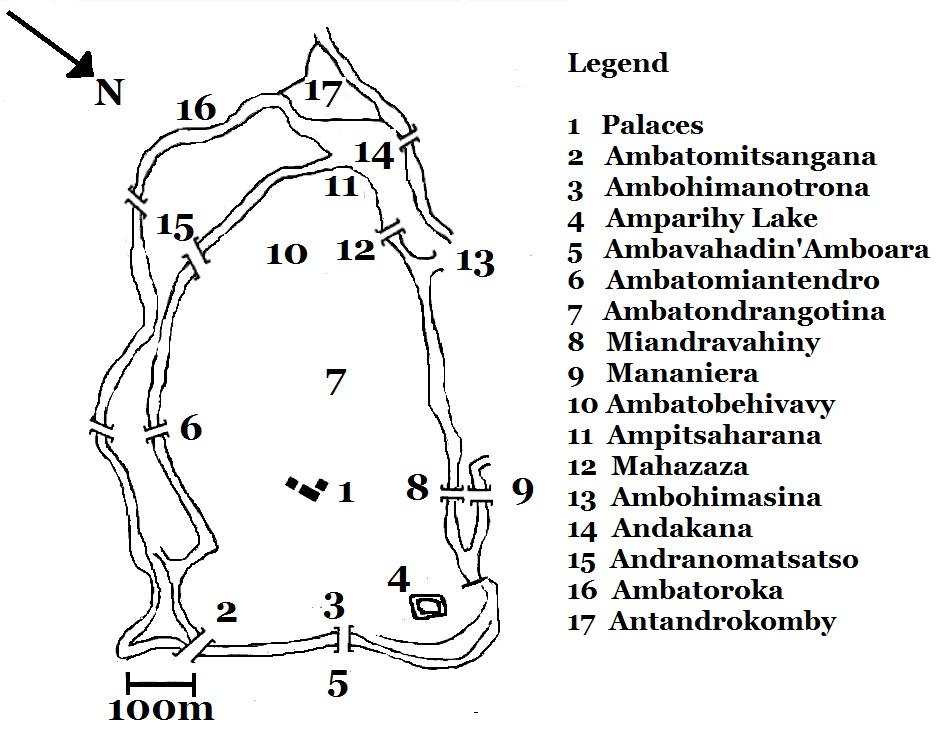
Defensive trenches and gates of Ambohimanga

A series of protective trenches (hadivory) and stone walls, typical of fortified royal cities in Imerina since the 15th century, surround the village of Ambohimanga. The trenches vary in depth to a maximum of 30 meters (98 ft). The oldest trenches at the site, called Mazavatokana, are located behind the modern-day rova and appear to predate the reign of the hill's first known king, Andriantsimitoviaminiandriana; local tradition maintains that they were dug in the early 16th century on the command of King Andrianjaka, who may have used the site as a launching point for military offensives in his war against the Vazimba. Andriantsimitoviaminiandriana was the first to systematically establish a network of defenses around the hilltop settlement. This first king of Ambohimanga dug trenches around his Bevato compound, which was initially only accessible through a gateway he named Ambavahadikely.

The settlement was expanded by the construction of trenches bordering a second adjoining space to the northeast with two additional access points named Ampanidinamporona and Ambavahaditsiombiomby, the latter a natural gateway formed by two boulders. This latter entrance was most likely used to access the space even before the formal establishment of a royal city there, and is therefore considered by archaeologists to be the oldest gateway at the site. After the establishment of the rova, this entrance was reserved for use by the sovereign, a reflection of the spiritual significance of the northeastern direction and its association with the ancestors, whose benediction and hasina provided the basis for the sovereign's power and legitimacy. It was also used to bring sacrificial cattle into the compound. Andriantsimitoviaminiandriana then expanded toward the west to a series of natural defenses, including stony cliffs and steep forested slopes that obviated the need to dig defensive trenches, and he constructed several additional gates that he named Ambavahadimahazaza, Andranomboahangy and Ambavahadiantandranomasina. Andrianampoinimerina expanded the trenches around the city using fanampoana labor. During his reign, a trench was dug that entirely encircles the hill, and a series of trenches was dug alongside existing ones to further protect the city against enemies. The current defensive wall was reconstructed around 1830 during the reign of Queen Ranavalona I. An estimated sixteen million egg whites were mixed with lime to produce the whitewash for the compound's exterior and interior walls. Until French colonization in 1897 and at least as early as the reign of Radama I, foreigners and non-residents were not allowed to enter the royal city without authorization from the sovereign.

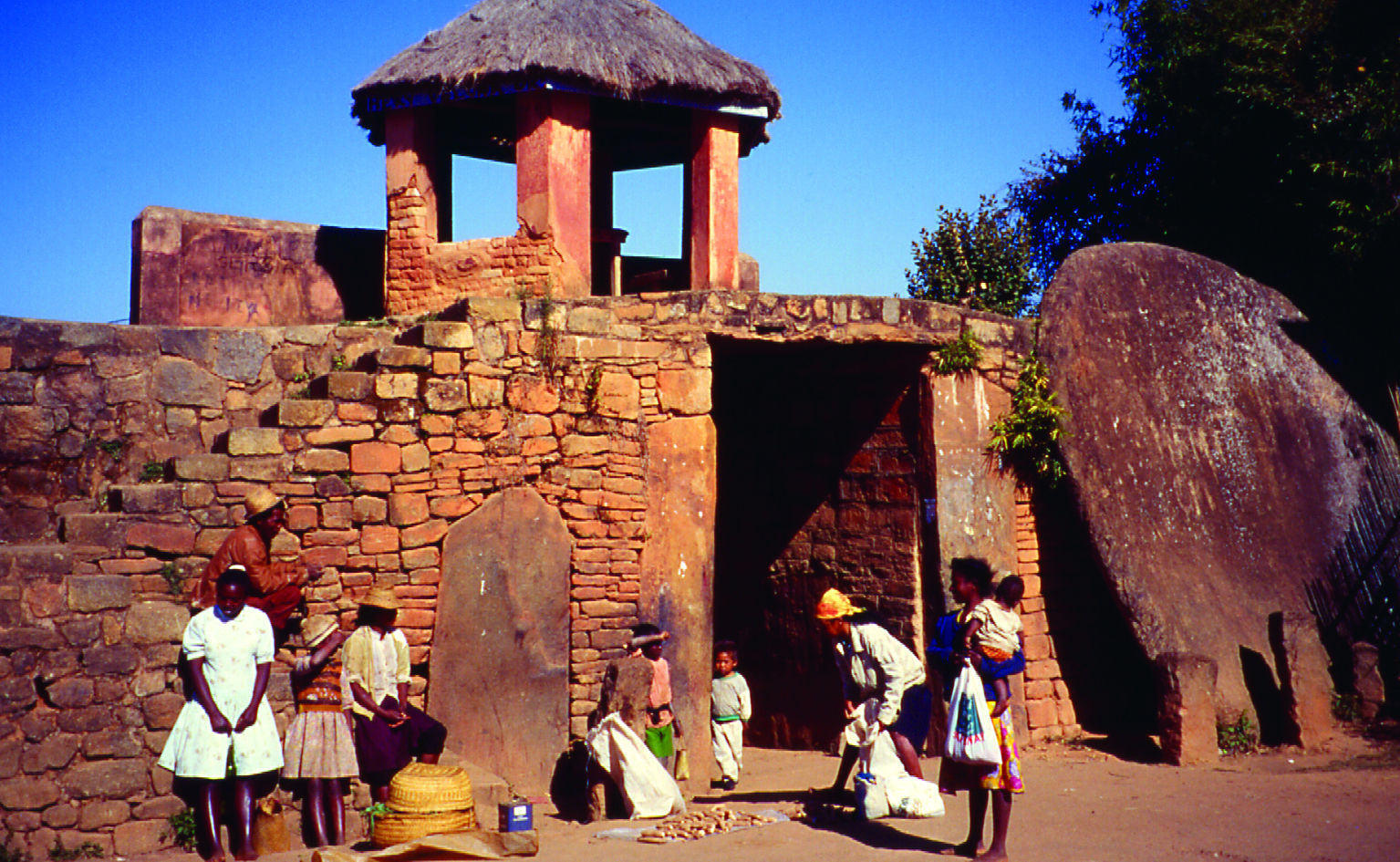
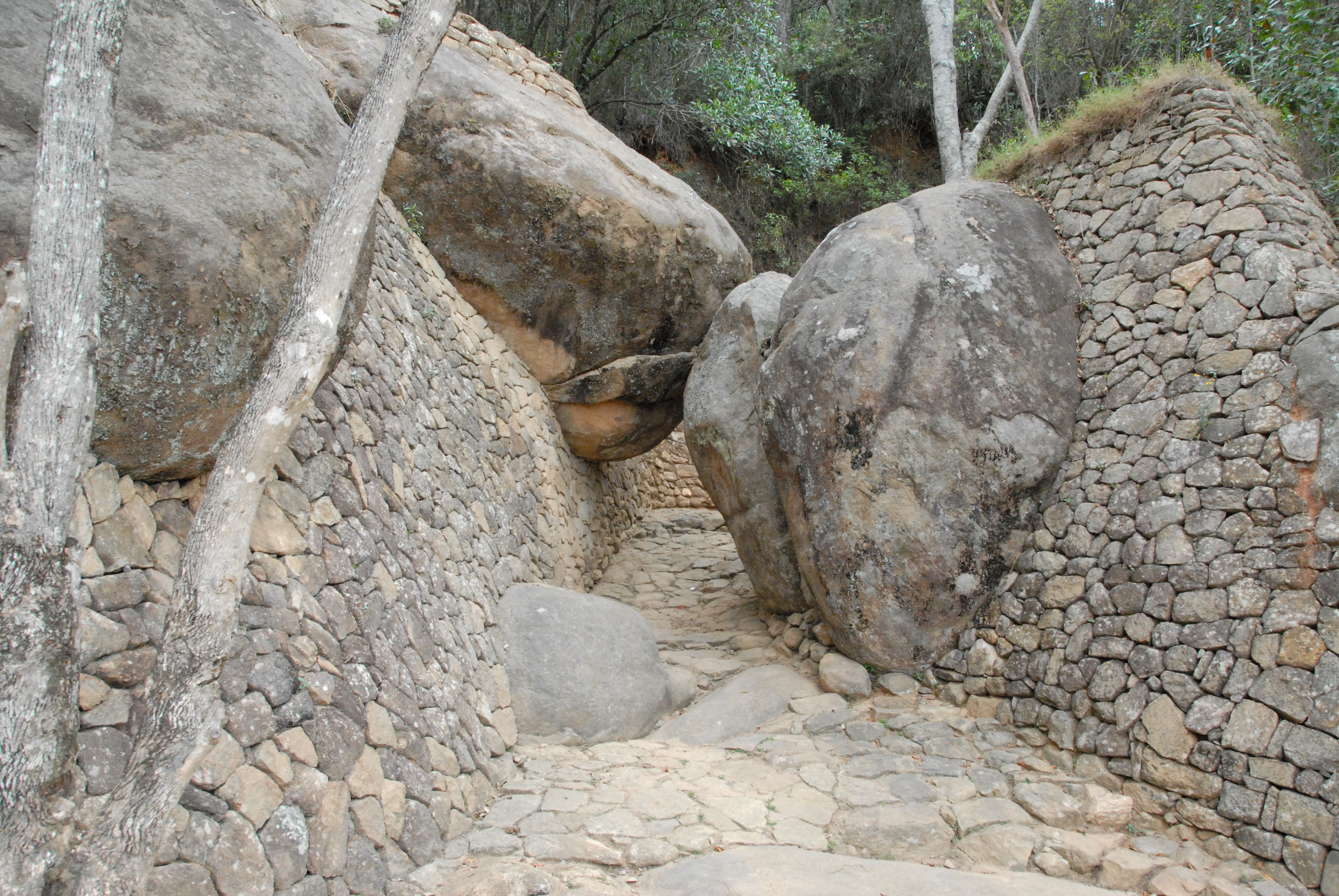
Gateways into Ambohimanga include the main gate Ambatomitsangana, which features a traditional stone disc door (vavahady), and a natural passageway called Ambavahaditsiombiomby believed to be the most ancient entrance to the site.

The royal compound can be accessed through fourteen stone gateways in total. In addition to the inner seven gateways constructed by Andriantsimitoviaminiandriana in the early 18th century, there exists an exterior wall and second set of seven gates that were built before 1794 during the reign of Andrianampoinimerina, an act that symbolically marked the completion of the king's reunification of Imerina. The largest and principal gate is also the most well-preserved and is known as Ambatomitsangana ("standing stone"). Every morning and evening, a team of twenty soldiers would work together to roll into place an enormous stone disk, 4.5 meters in diameter and 30 cm thick, weighing about 12 tons, to open or seal off the doorway. This form of gate (vavahady in the Malagasy language), typical of most walled royal villages of Imerina built between 1525 and 1897, protected the villagers from marauders.The gateway is topped by an observation post. The second main entrance, called Andakana, is situated in the western wall. Its stone disk is also intact, and the path leading to it is paved with cut stones. Both Ambatomitsangana and Andakana were considered the gateways of the living; cadavers could not be transported through them, and passage was denied to anyone who had recently come into contact with the dead. A northern gateway called Miandrivahiny retains its well-preserved stone disk and was one of two entrances used whenever it was necessary to transport corpses in or out of the site; the second gateway for corpses was called Amboara. The stone disk at the southern Andranomatsatso gateway is also in good condition. This gateway, as well as Antsolatra and Ampitsaharana, were primarily used as lookout points. In the late 18th century Andrianampoinimerina replaced the Ambavahadiantandranomasina gate with another made of wood instead of stone and renamed it Ambavahadimasina. He and his successors shaved a small piece of wood from this lintel to light the sacred hearth fire that played a ritual role in the traditional circumcision ceremony. The red soil inside the gate and a series of wooden boards that paneled the approach to the gate were both considered sacred, and soldiers or others who anticipated a voyage away from Imerina would take handfuls of the soil and pieces of the wooden boards with them before departing in the belief that it would ensure their safe return.

Several large stones are set in the ground near gates or at points outside the walls of Ambohimanga. Rulers would stand atop these stones, each identified by distinct names, to deliver speeches to the public. To the south were the stones called Ambatomasina and Ambatomenaloha, while Ambatorangotina was situated to the northwest. The latter stone was of particular importance: here the twelve leaders of the Ambatofotsy clan first declared their rejection of Andrianjafy's rule and their allegiance to his nephew, Andrianampoinimerina. Upon taking the throne, Andrianampoinimerina used this site to first declare new laws and decrees that would later be announced throughout the kingdom. This was also the main site at Ambohimanga for dispensing justice. After Andrianampoinimerina's succession to the throne, he sacrificed a black zebu whose mother had died, named Lemainty ("black one"), with repeated spear thrusts; after its death, the animal was cut into pieces and buried on the site. Lemainty was thereafter regularly invoked in royal speeches and decrees to allude to the fate of those who misguidedly sought to forsake the protection of their guardian, the sovereign, and his laws.

=== Natural features ===
Two sanctified, stone-covered springs nearby feed a stream that is believed to hold powers of purification and flows through the buffer zone surrounding the royal city. Their water was used to form the sacred lake of Amparihy, artificially created by at least the 18th century to provide water to fill two ceremonial pools constructed within the Ambohimanga compound. Oral history attributes the creation of the lake to Andrianampoinimerina. He reportedly engaged the labor of surrounding villagers to dig the lake at the site of the spring-fed swamp at the base of the hill. Before initially filling the lake with water carried in baked earthen jars from the sacred sites of Alasora, Antsahatsiroa and Anosibe, the lake's creation was sanctified by sacrificing zebu at the site; Andrianampoinimerina is also said to have thrown pearls and silver rings into the lake to inaugurate it.

The forest at Ambohimanga benefited from customary protection and today represents the largest of the last remaining fragments of primary forest that formerly covered the highlands. It contains a representative assortment of native tree and plant species, in particular the endemic tree zahana (phyllarthron madagascariensis) and a variety of indigenous medicinal plants, many possessing traditional or spiritual importance. Examples include the native bush Anthocleista, traditionally believed to attract lightning and often planted in clusters beside villages; the Dracaena plant, traditionally used for hedges and planted at sacred sites in valleys or other natural features where people would come to communicate with ancestral spirits; and the Phyllarthron vine, which was planted in sacred thickets and harvested for its wood, which was traditionally used to fashion handles for diverse tools. The recent and growing presence of two foreign species (golden bamboo and lantana) threaten the integrity of the site's ecosystem. The local management authority is currently engaged in activities to eradicate the encroaching vegetation.

=== Villages ===
The villages surrounding the royal city date back to at least the 16th century, when the valleys around Ambohimanga hill were first transformed into rice paddies. Following the establishment of a royal city on the hilltop, successive rulers put in place regulations to govern the development of these villages and manage the subjects inhabiting them. Under Andrianampoinimerina, quotas established a set number of houses for members of influential clans in designated neighborhoods around the hill. This king also established rules to improve sanitation, including standards of cleanliness in domestic courtyards and the quarantine of people suffering from certain illnesses. Ranavalona I specified the physical characteristics of newly constructed houses, including their size and decorative features. In 1862 Radama II gave permission to a group of Christians to negotiate with Tsimahafotsy elders to construct the village's first church, but the Tsimahafotsy initially rejected the request. The king's successor, Queen Rasoherina, later requested the Christians not to gather indoors for services at Ambohimanga in honor of the sanctity of the ancestors. The court was Christianized by Ranavalona II in 1869, and a small chapel was built outside the city's eastern gate, but a permanent church at Ambohimanga was not built until 1883. Following a fire that occurred in 1870 during a visit of Ranavalona II to Ambohimanga, the queen decreed that houses in the village could be constructed in brick, a material previously reserved for tomb and wall construction. A series of ancestral fady (taboos) decreed by Andrianampoinimerina continue to apply in the village, and include prohibitions against corn, pumpkins, pigs, onions, hedgehogs and snails; the use of reeds for cooking; and the cutting or collecting of wood from the sacred forests on the hill.

== Compounds ==
Each of the three compounds built within the rova by successive Merina rulers bears distinct architectural styles that reflect the dramatic changes experienced in Imerina over the reign of the 19th century Kingdom of Madagascar, which saw the arrival and rapid expansion of European influence at the royal court. The site contains a blend of traditional Merina and European styles and construction methods. The predominant architectural features and layout of the royal city follow the traditional model of rova construction that predominated in the Highlands from the 15th century. Following tradition, the homes of the living are constructed of wood and vegetation (living materials), while the tombs of the dead are built in stone (cold, inert material). The selection of specific wood and plant materials used in construction, each of which were imbued with distinct symbolic meaning, reflected traditional social norms and spiritual beliefs. Since 1996, many of the buildings have undergone restoration using traditional materials and construction practices appropriate to the era in which the buildings were first erected.

=== Bevato compound ===
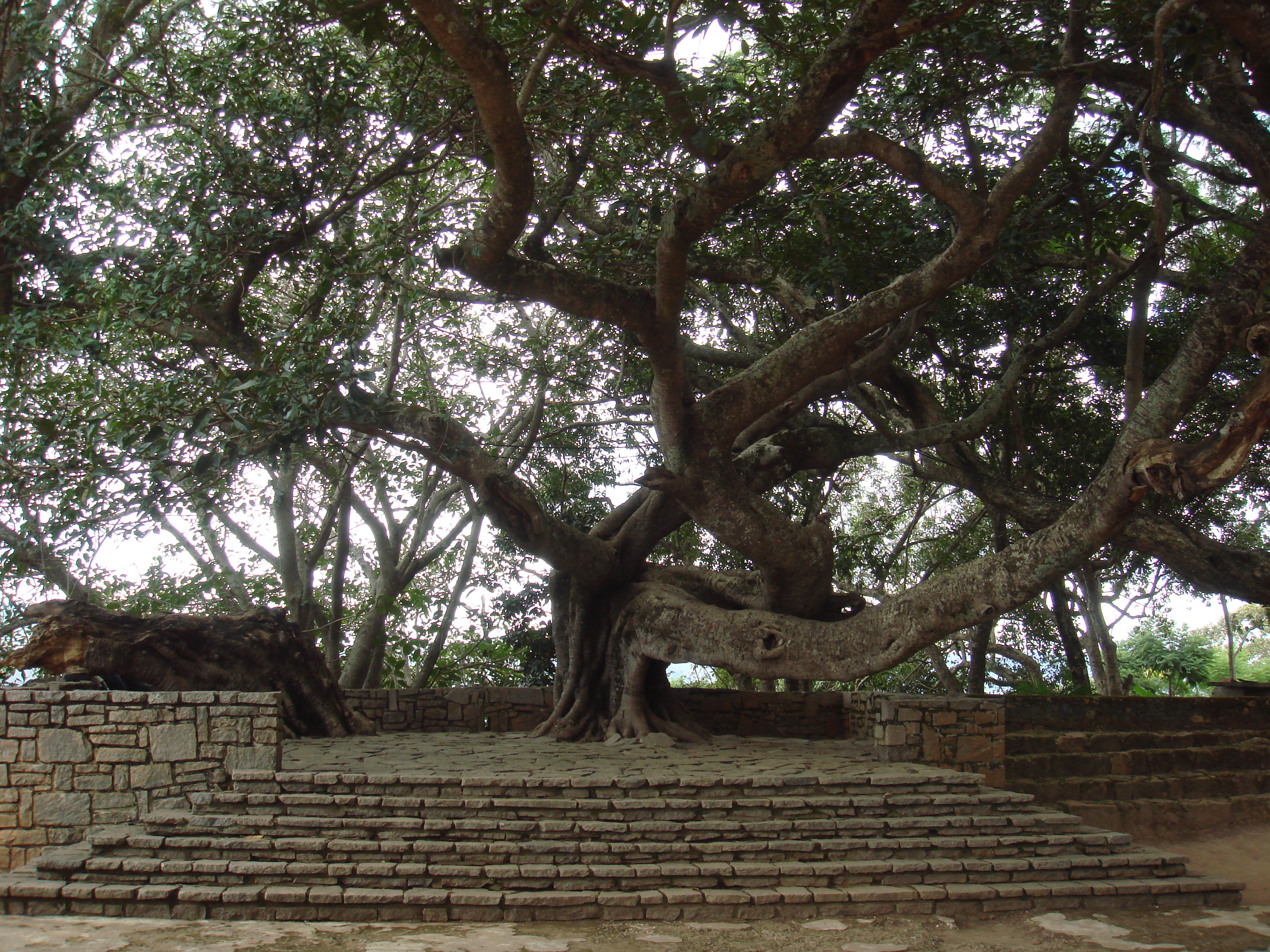
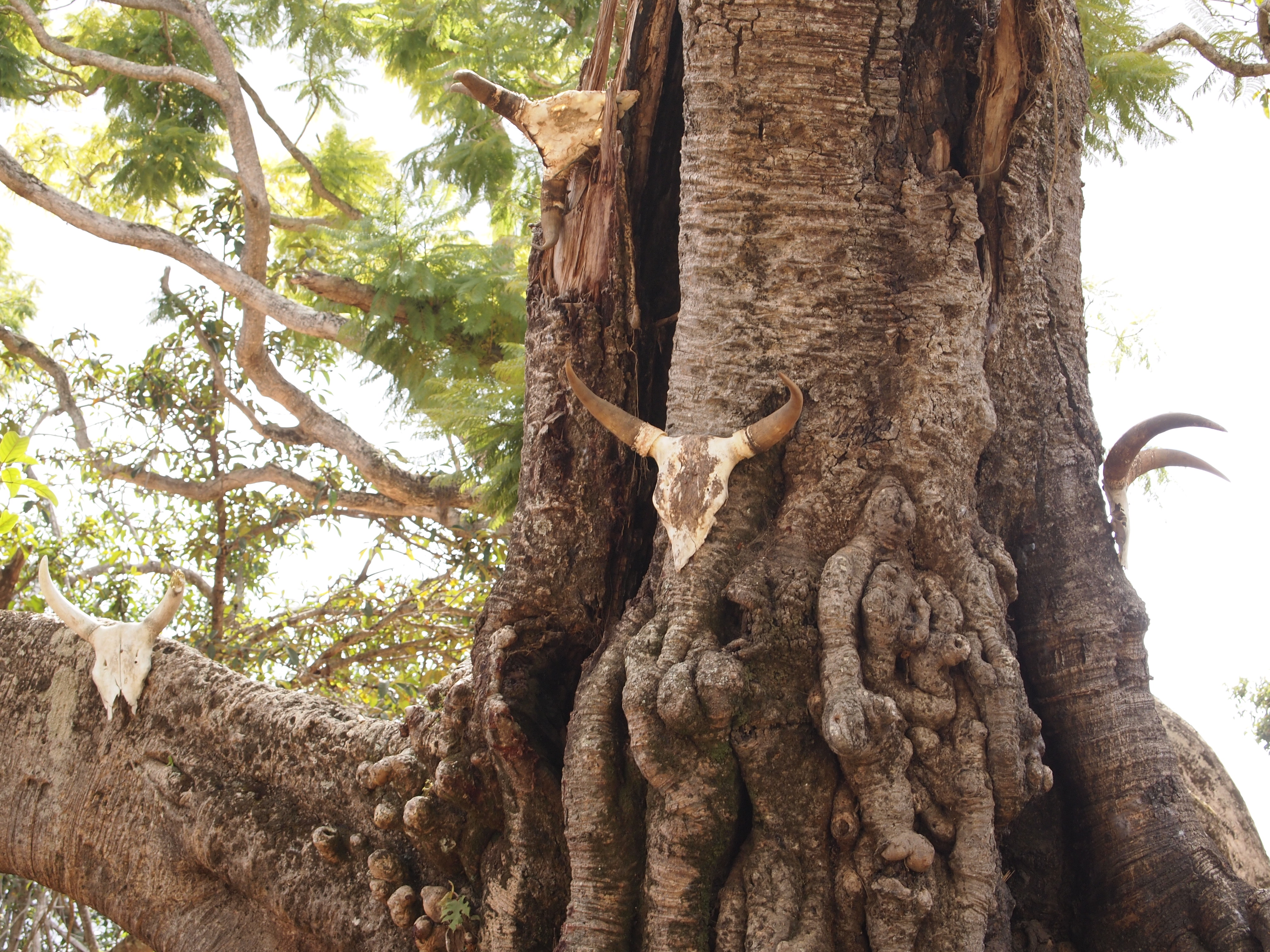
The Fidasiana-Bevato esplanade is shaded by sacred aviavy trees (left) and attracts pilgrims who come to make sacrifices to the ancestors (right).

The earliest of the royal compounds at Ambohimanga, Bevato ("many stones", also called Fidasiana-Bevato), was first established by Andriamborona, who built houses there for himself and his family in the late 17th century. It was inhabited by Andriantsimitoviaminiandriana from 1710 to 1730, during which time he expanded the compound on three occasions. The compound was originally surrounded by a low rock wall that was replaced under Andriambelomasina by a wooden palisade. Ranavalona I expanded the compound toward the west by relocating a small house containing the royal idol Rafantaka; further westward expansion was completed under Ranavalona II. Under Ranavalona I and her successors, Besakana served as the residence of the sovereign's relatives during their visits to Ambohimanga. All buildings on the compound were destroyed by the French, who constructed a school on the site (Ecole Officiel), later followed by the Ambohimanga town hall (Tranompokonolona), which was razed after Madagascar regained independence.

Andriamborona, the first inhabitant of the hill, built a tomb for his mother in Bevato. When the king asked him to relocate, Andriamborona agreed to move both his houses and his mother's tomb. In acknowledgement of this consideration, the king marked the site of the tomb with a large stone and nearby he built the first royal residence at the rova as his home. The stone was thereafter considered sacred: Andrianampoinimerina was enthroned while standing atop this stone, and slaves were brought there to swear allegiance to their masters. It was used in the ritual sacrifice of volavita zebu during the Fandroana Malagasy New Year (a festival also known as the "royal bath"). Sovereigns traveling on horseback would stand upon it to aid in mounting or dismounting, and after the Christianization of the court under Ranavalona II in 1869, religious services took place here. The royal tombs were relocated to the Mahandrihono compound under Ranavalona I to expand the courtyard.

According to the Tantara ny Andriana eto Madagasikara transcription of Merina oral histories, the first house built by Andriantsimitoviaminiandriana was called Bevato. It was located at the southern extreme of the compound and housed the king and his wives. Andriambelomasina built and occupied a second house, called Manatsaralehibe ("large and great"). This house was highly venerated by Andrianampoinimerina: escaped convicts who managed to reach the building were pardoned, and this was the only historic house in the compound that Ranavalona I did not remove. According to a second source, the two oldest houses in the compound were called Mahitsielafanjaka ("one who is upright rules long") and Manatsarakely ("small and great"). These were reportedly built by either Andriamborona or Andriantsimitoviaminiandriana in the early 18th century and were occupied by Andriantsimitoviaminiandriana and his 12 wives. Another account states that Manatsarakely was inhabited by Andrianjafy and later by the wives of Andrianampoinimerina; this house and Mahitsielafanjaka were renovated under Ranavalona I using wood from the region of Sihanaka to repanel the walls.

Oral history credits Andrianampoinimerina with the construction of a second pair of houses in the compound. Beginning with his reign, Bevato became the second most important compound after Mahandrihono and enclosed four houses for royal wives and their servants. He also kept the royal idol Ifantaka here in a small house surrounded by a wooden palisade, which remained until the Christian convert Ranavalona II symbolically destroyed the royal idols in a bonfire in 1869. After removing the historic Tsararay in the Mahandrihono compound, Andrianampoinimerina built a new house with the same name in the Bevato compound. Tsararay was the residence of his wives when they would make the journey to Ambohimanga. The Bevato compound in Antananarivo was likewise reserved for the sovereign's wives under the reign of Andrianampoinimerina, but featured many more houses to enable each wife her own residence. When wives would travel to Ambohimanga they were obliged to share the houses, and those who preferred not to share typically stayed at the houses of villagers beyond the city walls.

Ranavalona I planted a pair of royal fig trees at the far end of the Bevato compound and stood between them when addressing the public. These were later complemented by additional fig trees planted all around the courtyard by Ranavalona II and jacarandas planted by the French during the colonial period. The figs that shade the esplanade are believed to be imbued with hasina enhanced by the bones and skulls of sacrificed zebu and special marking stones that pilgrims from across Madagascar, Mauritius, Reunion and Comoros have come to place around them. Pilgrims gather in this courtyard to celebrate the Fandroana ceremony, during which time the sovereign historically engaged in a ritual bath to wash away the sins of the nation and restore order and harmony to society. Today, pilgrims celebrate by offering sacrifices or prayers to honor, appease or commune with their ancestors.

While Bevato was the location of larger gatherings and royal festivals, royal edicts and public judgments were handed down in the sacred courtyard (kianja) of Ambarangotina at the base of the hill leading to the Bevato compound. From the kianja sovereigns delivered kabary to announce new laws and decrees and administer justice. The sovereign would stand atop the kianja's vatomasina (a large granite boulder), which is surrounded by a brick half-wall and accessed by a set of steps.

=== Mahandrihono compound ===
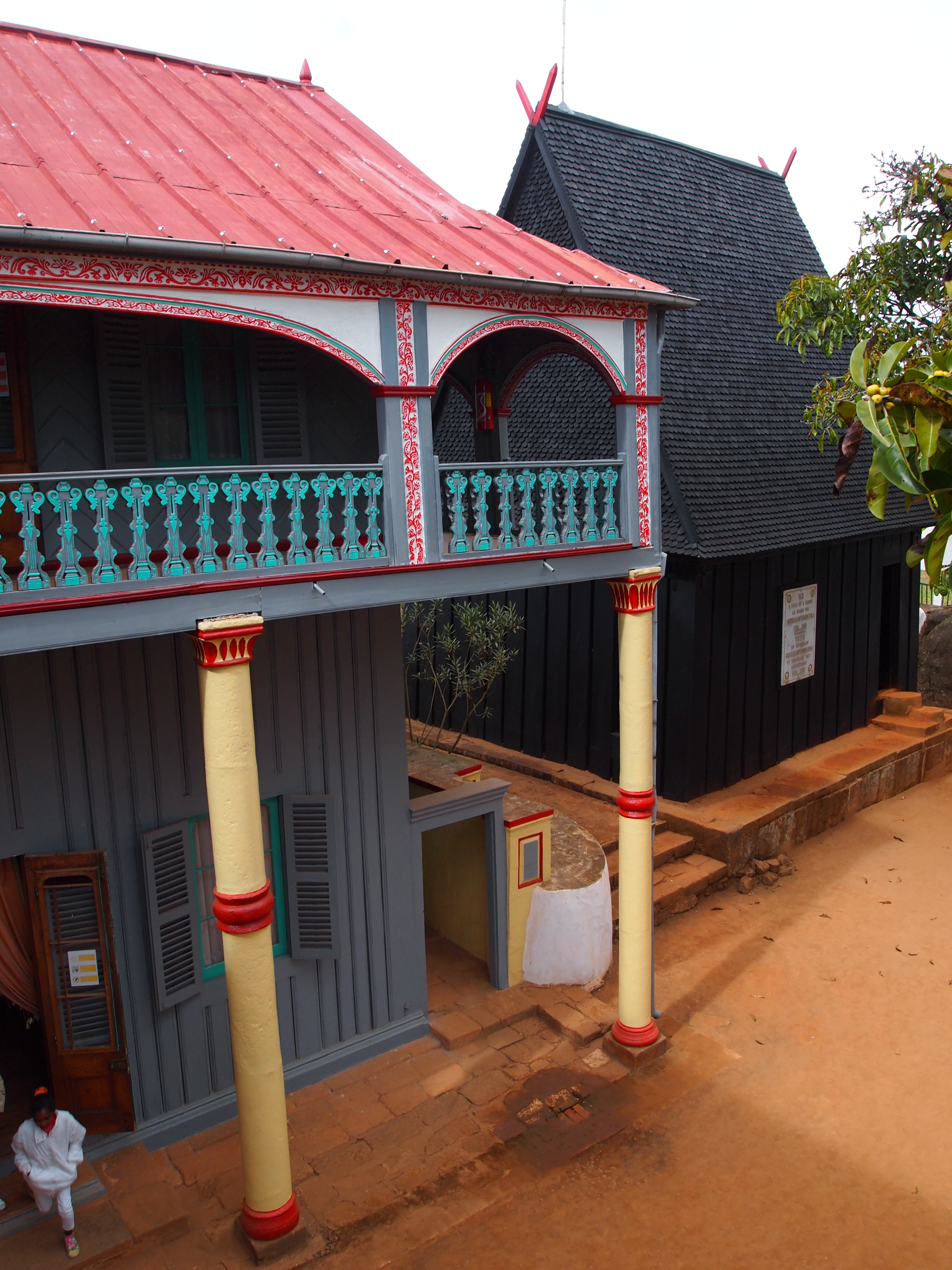
View of Mahandrihono palace from Fandriampahalemana

The compound Mahandrihono ("knows how to wait") is the most expansive and well-preserved of the rova structures at Ambohimanga. It lies to the east of the central courtyard and sits at a higher elevation than Bevato, symbolically representing its greater political significance. It was first established by Andriambelomasina in the early 18th century during the reign of his father, Andriantsimitoviaminiandriana. Andriambelomasina surrounded the compound with a stone wall and within it built three houses as residences for his children—two twin houses (tranokambana) set side by side named Mahandry ("knows how to wait") and Tsararay ("has a good father"), and a third named Manandraimanjaka ("has a father who rules")—taking pains to illustrate through the names of these houses that he had no intention of usurping his father. When Andriantsimitoviaminiandriana eventually died, Andriambelomasina entombed him behind the twin houses. In Andrianampoinimerina's time this compound corresponded with the Mahandrihono compound at the rova in Antananarivo, being reserved for the king alone with his residence positioned beside the tombs of the ancestors.

Andrianampoinimerina removed the twin houses to build his much larger Mahandrihono residence, which was decorated with silver birds and chains. He also expanded the compound and added a second enclosure of voafotsy wood (replaced annually) around the exterior of the stone walls. Mandraimanjaka was removed and in its place Andrianampoinimerina built a house with a small tower, which he named Manjakamiadana ("where it is good to rule"), designating it as the residence for the royal sampy (idol) called Imanjakatsiroa and the guardians assigned to protect it. Two other idols were kept nearby: Ifantaka, kept in a house in the Bevato compound, and Kelimalaza, guarded in its house at the Ambohimanga neighborhood of Ambohimirary. Under Radama I, the stone wall was reinforced with palisades that enclosed three houses, two of which were twin houses like those that Andriambelomasina had built. Ranavalona I enlarged the compound's courtyard and expanded Manjakamiadana. She constructed the stone walls that currently enclose the compound, as well as its two stone gateways. Ranavalona II re-added palisades to the compound's stone walls. She demolished Manjakamiadana and in its place constructed two hybrid Malagasy-European pavilions using wood from the historic and spiritually significant Masoandro house, which had been removed from the royal compound of Antananarivo by Ranavalona I. French general Joseph Gallieni used these European-influenced buildings as his summer residence in the early years of the French colonial period. In 2013, Andrianampoinimerina's original house, the reconstructed tombs, and the two royal pavilions are preserved in the compound, which also includes a watchtower, a pen for sacrificial zebu, and two pools constructed during the reign of Ranavalona I.

==== Mahandrihono palace ====
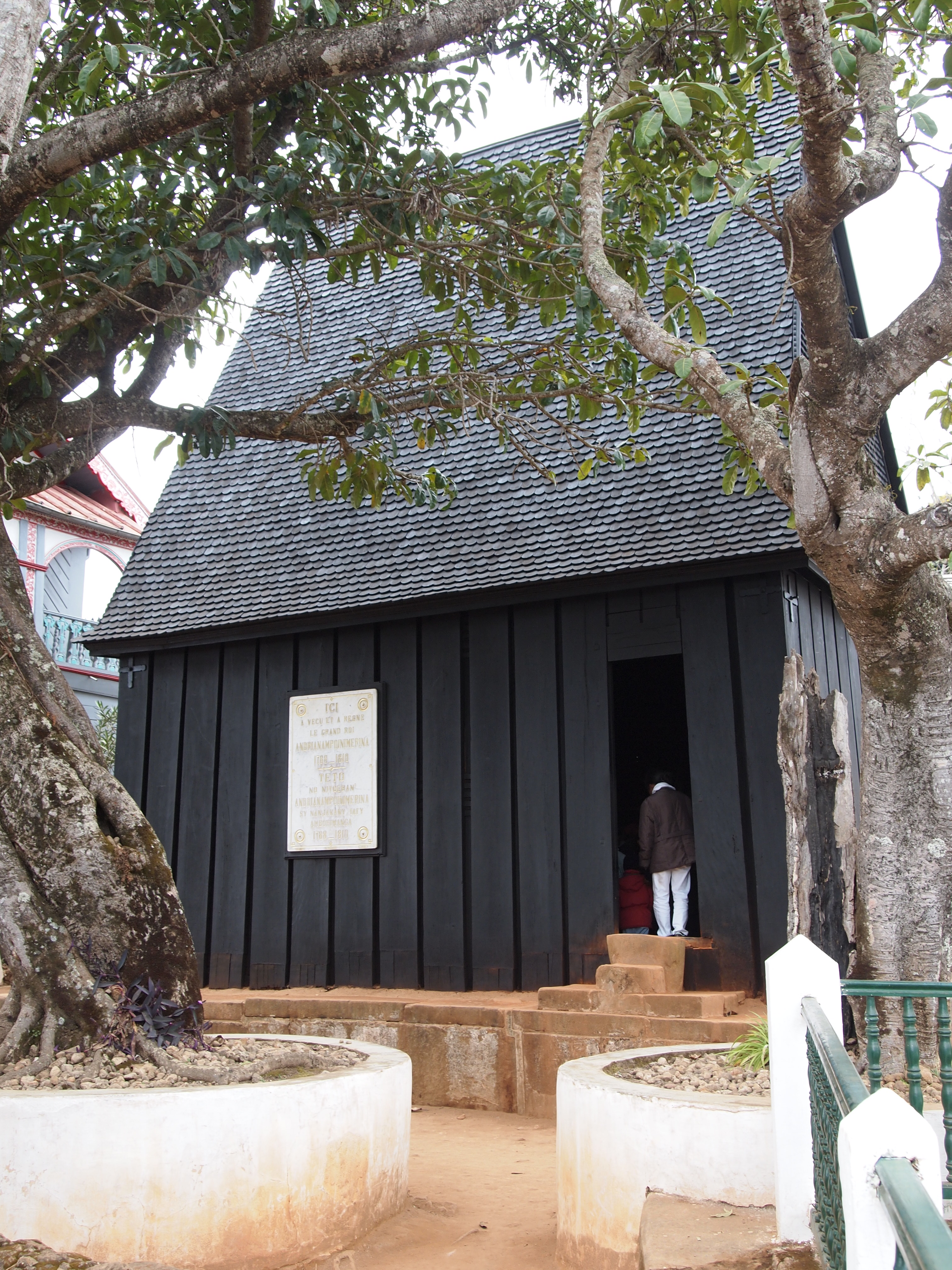
Mahandrihono palace was the home of King Andrianampoinimerina.

Among the buildings extant at the royal city during the time of King Andrianampoinimerina (1787–1810), only the original Mahandrihono palace remains intact. The Mahandrihono palace, which served as the home of Andrianampoinimerina before he relocated the political capital of Imerina to Antananarivo, has been preserved in its original state since construction, excepting the replacement of the original roof thatch with wooden shingles. The simple wooden structure is constructed in the traditional style of the aristocracy of Imerina: the walls are made of solid rosewood and topped by a peaked roof that is supported by 10-meter central rosewood pillar, much like the one that had originally supported the roof of the Rova Manjakamiadana of Antananarivo before it was destroyed by fire in 1995. The roof horns (tandrotrano) formed at each end of the roof peak by the crossing of the gable beams were originally silver-plated, and a silver eagle was affixed in the middle of the roof peak. Silver ornaments were also hung from the corners of the roof in the interior of the house. The building's name is inscribed on a white marble plaque affixed to an exterior wall near one of the building's two entrances. This house contains a number of items that belonged to Andrianampoinimerina, including weapons, drums, talismans, a board of fanorona and a bed raised on stilts. During Andrianampoinimerina's time, his wives were allowed to visit this building but not allowed to sleep there overnight. The site is highly sacred: Queen Rasoherina and her successors often sat on the stepping stone at its threshold to address their audience, and many pilgrims come here to connect with the spirits of Andrianampoinimerina and his ancestors. Visitors are asked to enter the house by stepping in with their right foot and exiting backwards, according to custom, in order to show respect for the spirit of Andrianampoinimerina.

==== Royal pavilions ====
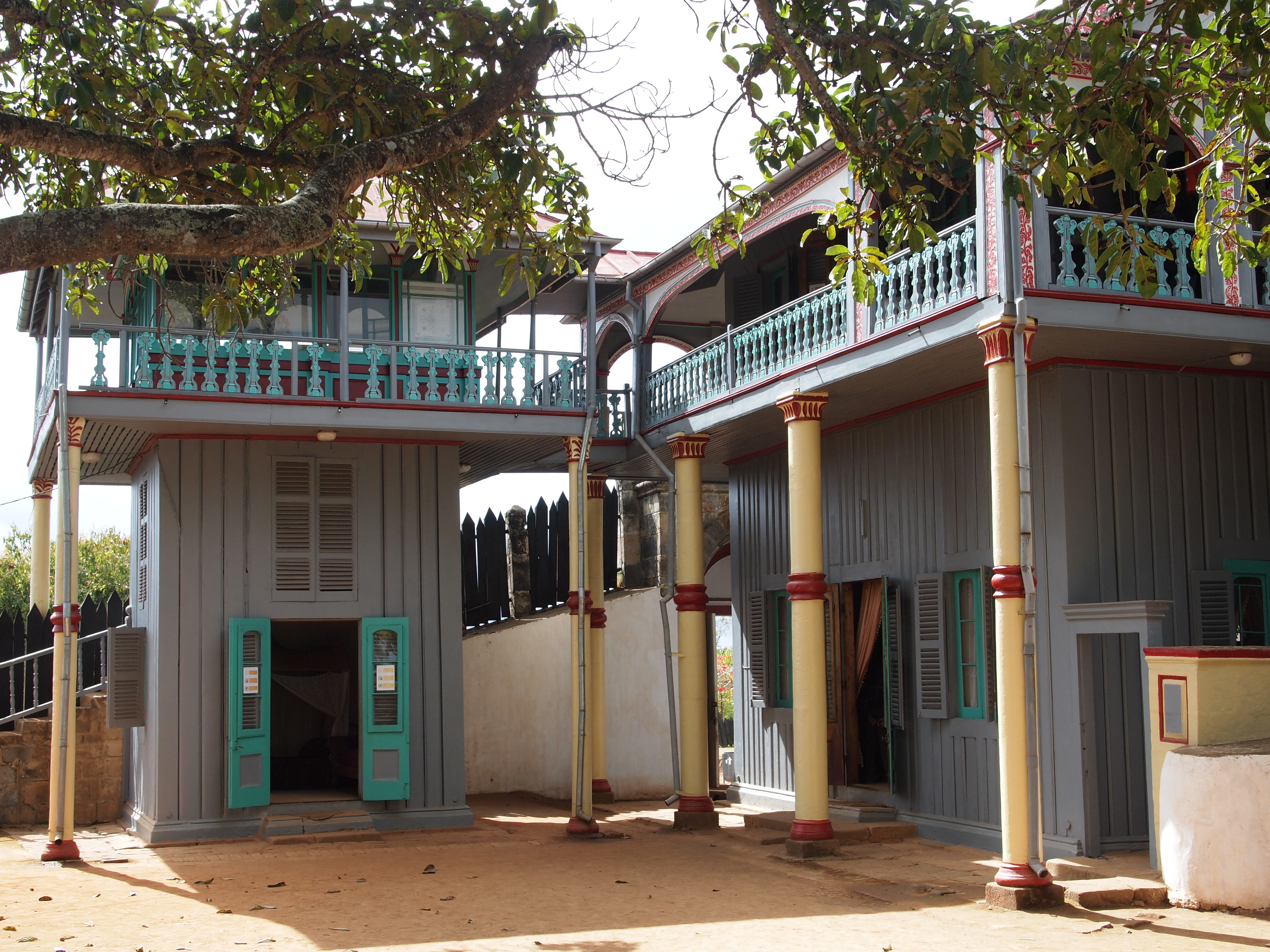
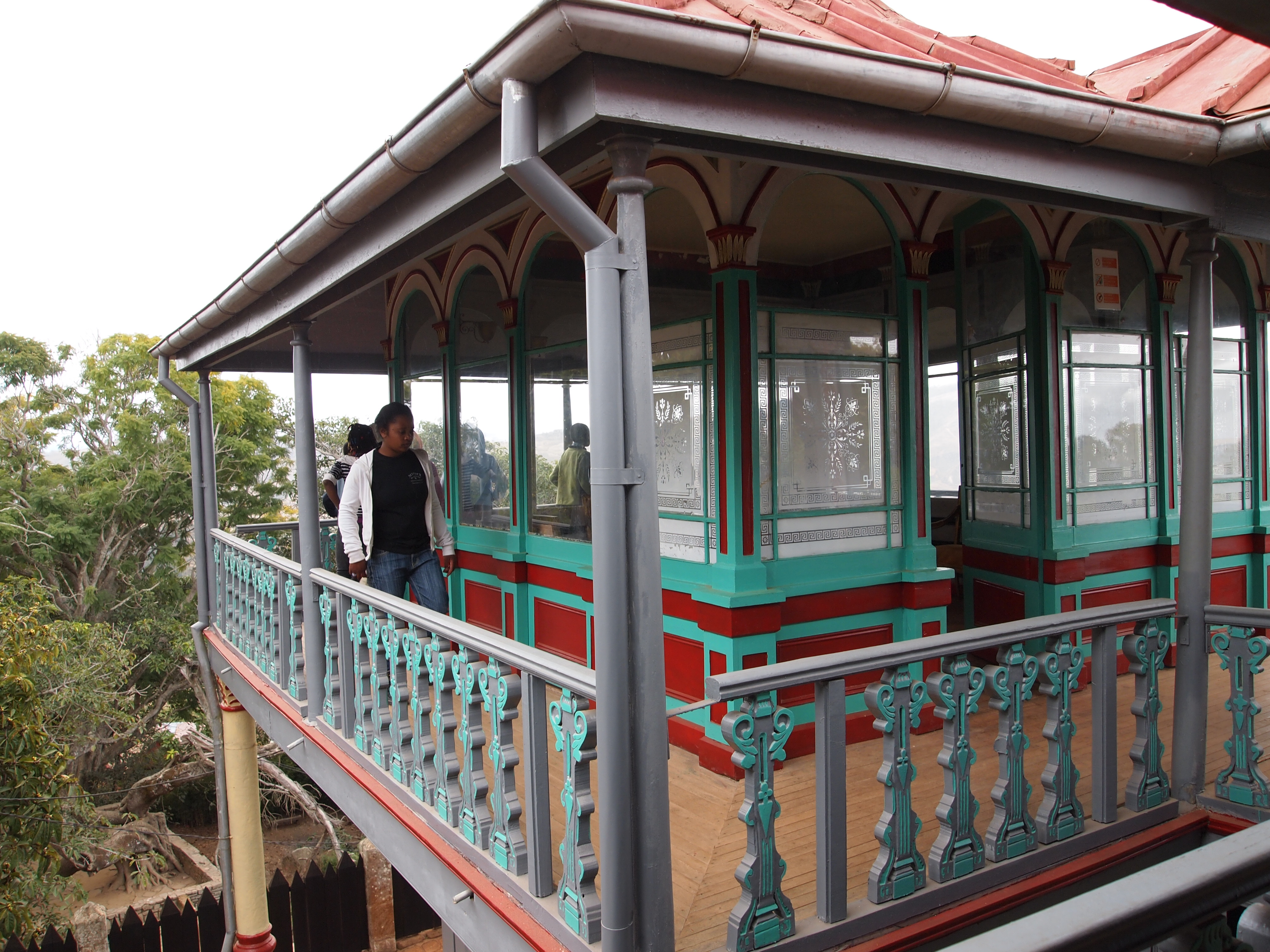
View of Tranofitaratra and Fandriampahalemana (left) and detail of Tranofitaratra meeting room (right)

Two ornate palace buildings were built of rosewood in this compound in 1871 on the former site of the Manjakamiadana royal idol residence. The first and larger of the two, Fandriampahalemana, features a room for receiving visitors and a large salon on the ground floor, and the bedrooms of Queen Ranavalona II and her serving lady on the second floor. The original European furnishings have been preserved, and the many gifts given by foreign dignitaries to the queen are on display here. The queen's bedroom is considered a sacred place and many visitors come on pilgrimage to pray to her spirit.

The second, smaller pavilion is known as the Tranofitaratra ("house of glass") and was constructed in 1862 under the orders of Ranavalona II. The queen would gather her ministers for counsel in this building, and the large windows on all four sides of the building provided a view of the countryside below, enabling the queen to ascertain the security of her surroundings. The glass used in the construction was imported by an Englishman named Parrett in 1862.

==== Royal tombs ====
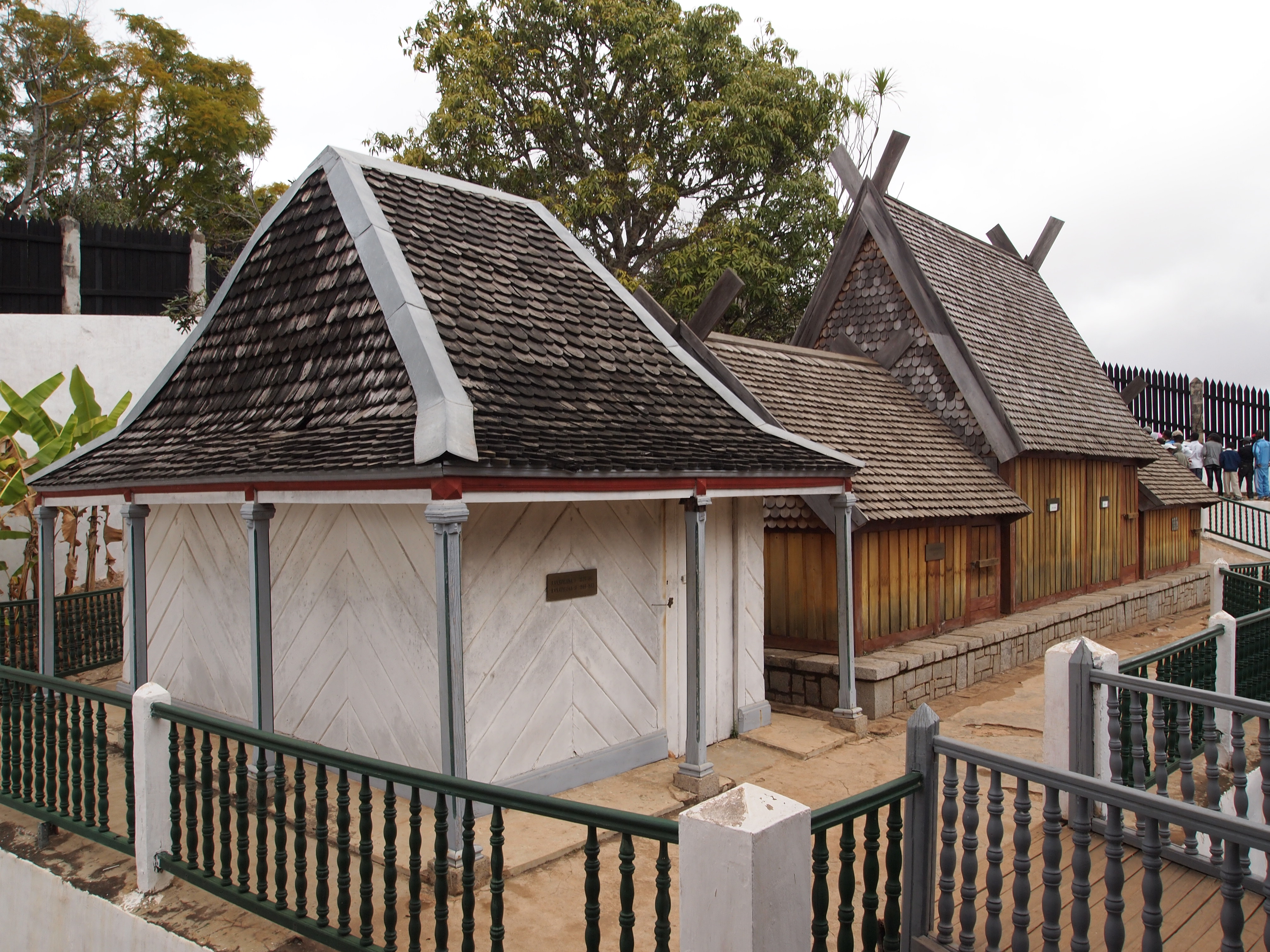
Royal remains are interred in tombs beneath the tranomasina.

The compound originally housed twelve royal tombs constructed in the style of Merina nobles, with a stone crypt topped by a small, windowless wooden house (tranomasina) indicative of aristocratic rank. The peaks of these tombs were aligned from north to south. Sovereigns originally buried in the four largest tombs, situated to the north of the others, included Andriantsimitoviaminiandriana, Andriambelomasina, Andriampoinimerina, Ranavalona I and Ranavalona II, while the wives and relatives of sovereigns were buried in the smaller tombs. According to oral histories, at its 19th-century peak the Ambohimanga compound contained 12 tombs.

The tranomasina were destroyed in March 1897 by French authorities who removed the bodies of the sovereigns interred here and relocated them to the royal tombs at the Rova of Antananarivo. The rich collection of funerary objects enclosed within the tombs was also removed for display in the Manjakamiadana palace on the Antananarivo rova grounds, which the Colonial Authority transformed into an ethnological museum. This was done in an effort to desanctify the city of Ambohimanga and break the spirit of the Menalamba resistance fighters who had been rebelling against French colonization for the past year, break popular belief in the power of the royal ancestors, and relegate Malagasy sovereignty under the Merina rulers to a relic of an unenlightened past. A French garrison was housed within the royal city and military buildings were erected on top of the stone tomb foundations. A kitchen and military canteen were built on top of the tombs of Andrianampoinimerina and Andriamasinavalona. By 1904, the military buildings were likewise demolished, leaving the stone tomb foundations intact.

The desecration of the two most sacred sites of Merina royalty represented a calculated political move intended to establish the political and cultural superiority of the French colonial power. In the popular view, the link between Ambohimanga and the ancestors (Andrianampoinimerina in particular) rendered the royal city an even more potent symbol and source of legitimate power than the capital of Antananarivo, which was seen as having become a locus of corrupt politics and deviance from ancestral tradition. Believing that the presence of the ancestors within the tombs sanctified the earth upon which the rova was built, Menalamba resistance fighters would come to Ambohimanga to collect handfuls of dirt from the base of the tombs to carry with them in their offensives against the French; the French authority intended by the removal of the sovereigns' bodies from the tombs to undermine the fighters' confidence and solidarity. Although the tombs were desecrated and the Menalamba fighters were ultimately defeated, Ambohimanga has retained its sacred character. The royal tombs were reconstructed in 2008 by the government of Madagascar under the Ravalomanana administration. During the 1995 fire that destroyed the tombs and other structures at the Rova of Antananarivo, the lamba-wrapped remains of only one sovereign—Ranavalona III—could be saved from the flames. The queen has since been re-interred in the royal tombs at Ambohimanga.

==== Other features ====
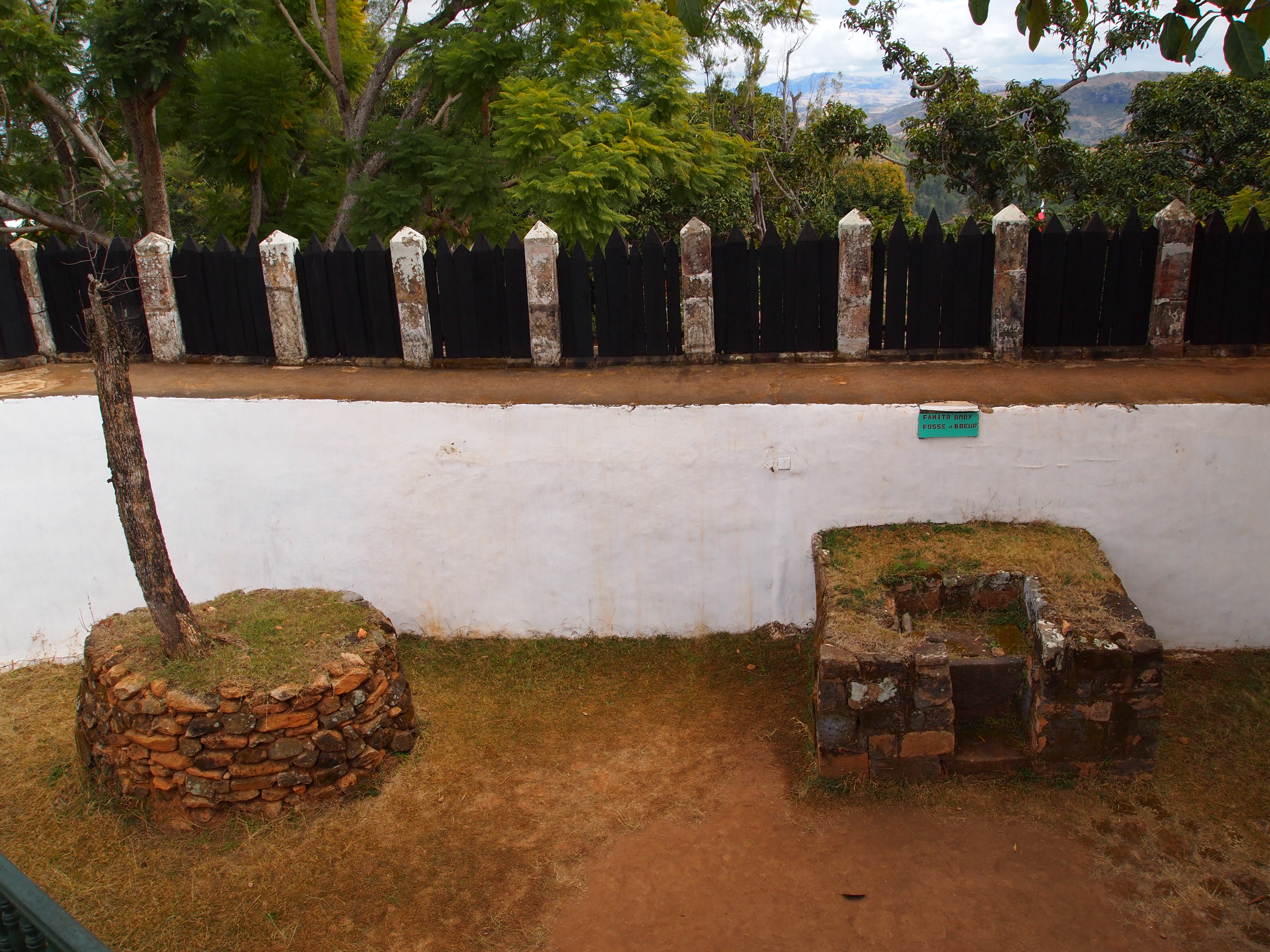
Pen (fahimasina) for sacrificial zebu

Two large basins have been carved from the stone foundation of the compound. Both constructed under Ranavalona I, one was a pool built in honor of the wives of soldiers of the ennobled Hova Tsimahafotsy clan of Ambohimanga, while the other was built for the wives of members of the elite military corps known as "the 500". The pools were strictly forbidden for public bathing or drinking and contained fish from Lake Itasy and specially consecrated water. Ranavalona I and her successors Radama I and Rasoherina used the larger royal pool for ritual purification during the annual fandroana new year festival.

Sacred zebu were kept in a sunken cattle pen (fahimasina) to the west of the kianja courtyard before sacrifice at royal events such as circumcisions and the fandroana festival. Only the two most highly prized types of zebu were kept here: black zebu with white markings on the forehead, called volavita, and entirely reddish-brown zebu, called malaza. In this way, the cattle were made to walk from the west toward the east (the direction of the ancestors and sanctity) before being slaughtered. Another large pen for sacrificial zebu was located to the northeast of this courtyard before being filled in by the French Colonial Authority in the late 19th century.

=== Nanjakana compound ===
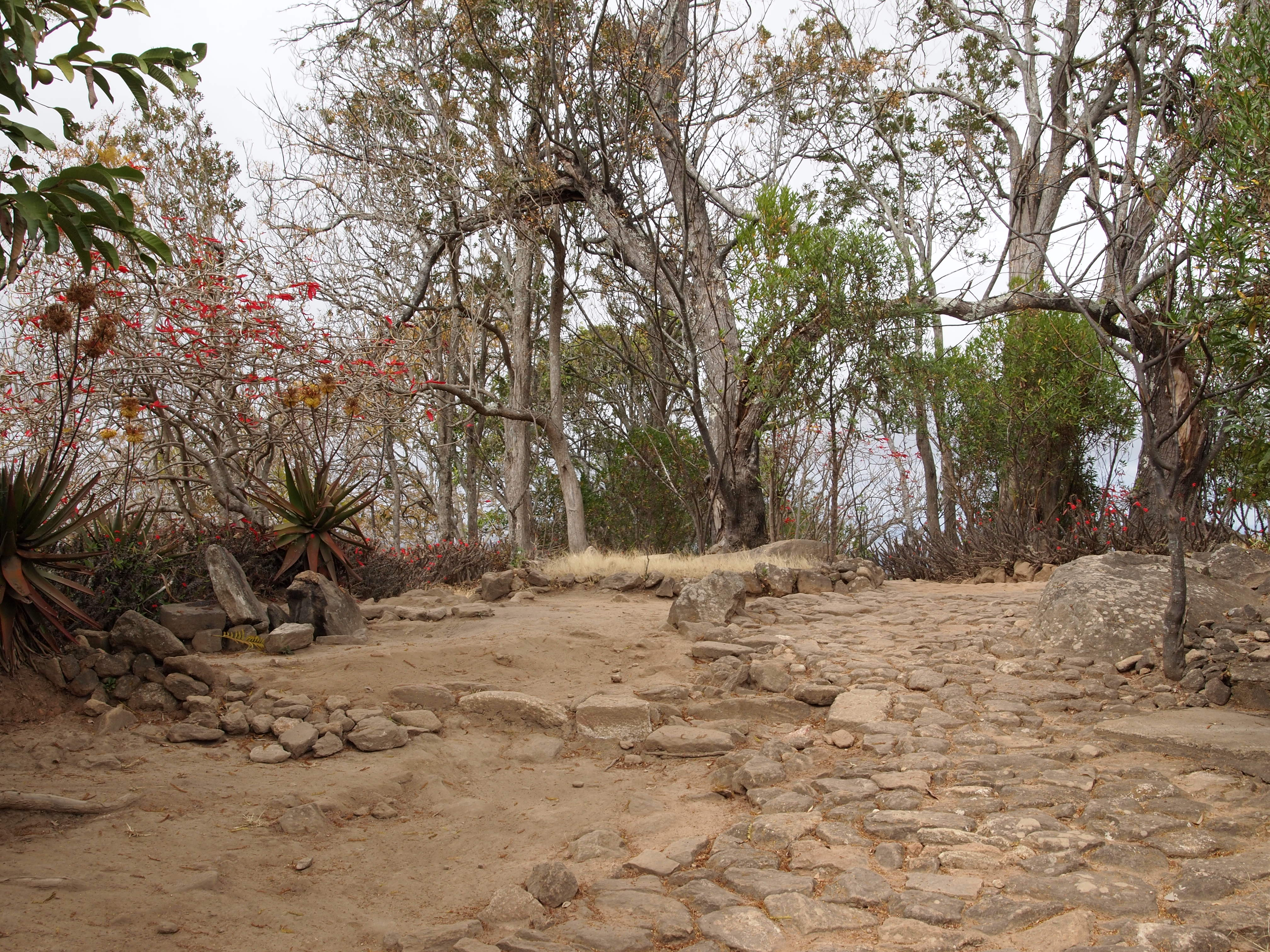
The Nanjakana compound was constructed by King Andrianjafy in the 18th century.

The Nanjakana compound is the most highly elevated of the three compounds in the rova at Ambohimanga. Located to the northeast of Mahandrinoro, this compound is believed to have been first constructed by Andrianjafy in the late eighteenth century. To the north of the compound is a stone esplanade that offers a clear view of the surrounding areas where Andrianampoinimerina reportedly came to reflect on his military strategy for bringing Imerina under his control. During the 1861 funeral of Queen Ranavalona I held in the Nanjakana compound, a spark accidentally ignited a nearby barrel of gunpowder destined for use in the ceremony, causing an explosion and fire that killed a number of bystanders and destroyed three of the compound's historic royal residences.

During the reign of Andrianampoinimerina, Nanjakana enclosed five houses that served as residences for his children. The house called Nanjakana ("place of royalty") was built by Andriambelomasina and renovated by Andrianampoinimerina, who moved it into the compound and lived in it before succeeding to the throne. He renovated it for use by his son, Radama I, who slept here during visits to Ambohimanga after succeeding his father as King of Madagascar. According to oral history, a large stone near the Nanjakana house was used as a seat by Andriambelomasina and Andrianampoinimerina when reflecting on governance decisions. Andrianampoinimerina added a two-story house called Manambitana ("favored by fate") that was the largest of all the traditional houses at Ambohimanga. The king's children slept on the upper floor during visits to the royal city, while the ground floor housed such royal property as palanquins and storage chests. This house was destroyed in the 1861 fire and was reconstructed under Rasoherina, who used it as a residence. After removing the historic Manandraimanjaka house from the Mahandrihono compound, Andrianampoinimerina built a new house with the same name in the Nanjakana compound. This was likewise destroyed in the 1861 fire, and was later rebuilt by Ranavalona II. Also destroyed in the fire was a house called Fohiloha ("short") that Ranavalona I had relocated from the royal compound in Antananarivo to the Nanjakana compound at Ambohimanga in 1845; Fohiloha was later rebuilt by Rasoherina. Other buildings that Ranavalona I moved from the rova at Antananarivo to the Nanjakana compound at Ambohimanga included Kelisoa ("beautiful little one") and Manantsara.

== Conservation and management ==
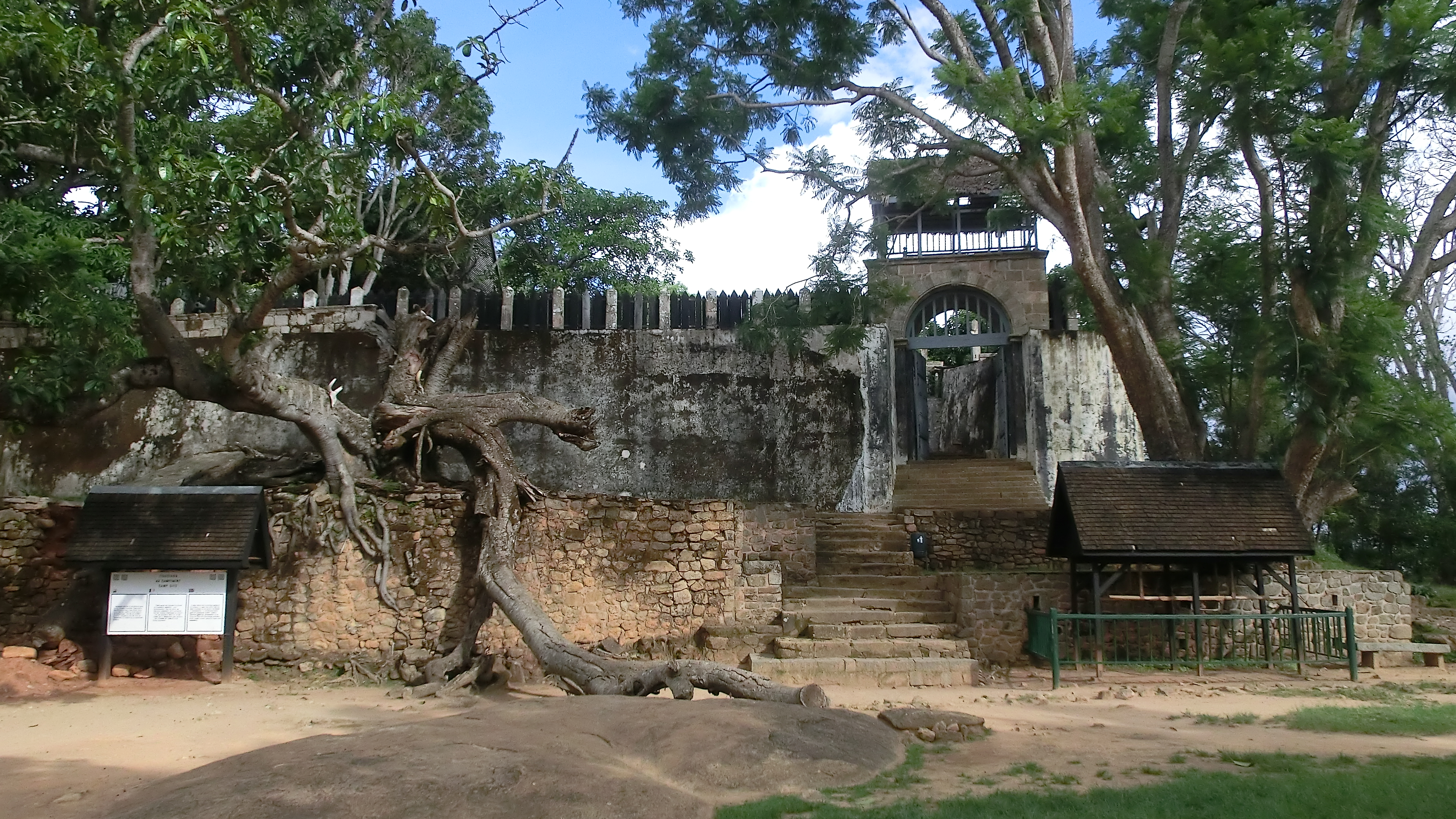
Cyclone Giovanna uprooted sacred fig trees in the 17th century Bevato compound in February 2012.

A popular tourist destination, Ambohimanga received 97,847 visitors in 2011. Visitors to the World Heritage Site are charged a fee (10,000 ariary for foreigners and 400 ariary for locals), which is largely used to pay for the preservation of the site. The commune of Ambohimanga Rova is a small but thriving rural village that lives on agriculture and services provided to tourists and pilgrims who visit the royal city. Multilingual tour guides can be hired at the site to provide detailed descriptions of its features and history. Photographs are permitted outdoors but prohibited inside the historic buildings. Tourism has been negatively affected at the site as a consequence of the 2009 Malagasy political crisis; management of the site has also been hampered by political instability and reduced revenues since 2009.

The extent of the area currently classified a World Heritage Site was under restricted access and protection during the imperial era and has been under some form of legal recognition and protection since French colonization, having been incorporated into the Colony Domains Service in 1897 and the National Inventory in 1939. It has since benefited from legal municipal protection and two national laws (passed in 1982 and 1983) protecting sites of historical and national interest. The Office of the Cultural Site of Ambohimanga (OSCAR), created by the Ministry of Culture, has managed the site and its entrance fees and state subventions since 2006, when a five-year management plan was developed for implementation by the group's 30 employees. These management and conservation activities are conducted in cooperation with the local population within the Rural Commune of Ambohimanga Rova. The Village Committee, comprising representatives of all the adjacent quarters and the local community, are also involved in the protection of the site. Conservation of Ambohimanga is further supported by a private association, Mamelomaso, which has also been active in campaigning for awareness and protection of cultural heritage and has contributed to the preservation of numerous other sites of cultural and historic significance in the highlands. In addition to helping replant the Ambohimanga woodlands, Mamelomaso has contributed to the restoration of the stones around the source of the spring, erected informational plaques around the hill, and paved a number of footpaths within the site. UNESCO contributed special financial support to restore historic structures at Ambohimanga threatened by exceptionally heavy rainfall and landslides. Volunteers from the C.H.A.M association participated in a restoration campaign during the year 1995.

Ambohimanga has been viewed by many Merina since the late 19th century as the embodiment of an ideal social order blessed by the ancestors. The significance attached to the site in Imerina increased further when its sister rova in Antananarivo was destroyed by fire in 1995, contributing to a sense that Ambohimanga was the last remaining physical link to this sanctified past. A small intellectual elite among the Tsimahafotsy clan of Ambohimanga and the nobles (andriana) believe that only Ambohimanga possesses the ancestral benediction (hasina) to serve as the national capital and imbue national leaders with the legitimacy and wisdom needed to rightly govern the country. The descendants of the andriana have consequently been key in promoting and protecting Ambohimanga, such as by playing a significant role in successfully lobbying UNESCO to list Ambohimanga as a World Heritage Site.

Despite these measures, the conservation of Ambohimanga is challenged by human and natural factors. The rapidly growing but relatively impoverished population around Ambohimanga occasionally engages in illegal harvesting of plants and trees from the surrounding forests, threatening the integrity of the natural environment. The forests and wooden structures on the site are also susceptible to fire. Following the 1995 destruction by fire of Ambohimanga's sister rova at Antananarivo, widely believed to have been a politically motivated arson, rumors have circulated that Ambohimanga could suffer a similar fate. Cyclone Giovanna, which passed over Madagascar in February 2012, caused considerable damage at the site. The wooden shingles of Andrianampoinimerina's house were torn off by the wind, exposing the historic objects inside to damage from the elements. The wooden fence surrounding the Mahandrihono compound was also badly damaged. Worst affected are the plants and trees at the site. Large swaths of endemic medicinal plants and trees in the forest were destroyed. Many of the sacred trees shading the royal city were uprooted, including sacred fig trees around the Fidasiana courtyard and inside the zebu pen. Two of the uprooted trees were of particular symbolic significance, having served as physical anchors for certain royal rituals since the 17th century. Shortly after the storm, OSCAR unveiled plans to plant a substitute fig for the uprooted one that had shaded the sacred stone in the Fidasiana courtyard. Most of the historic jacarandas planted over a century ago under French colonial rule were also destroyed. The extent of damage to the site has prompted traditionalists to demand renewed respect for the sanctity of the site by requesting adherence to traditional taboos put in place by Merina monarchs. These include banning pigs at the site, as well as the consumption of pork, tobacco, alcohol and cannabis on the grounds of the royal city.

== See also ==
- List of World Heritage Sites in Madagascar
