= Andriambelomasina =

King of Imerina-Avaradrano and Imerinatsimo
- Reign: c. 1730–1770
- Predecessor: Andriantsimitoviaminiandriana Andriandrazaka
- Successor: Andrianjafy
- Born: Rakotomavo before 1730; Ambohitrontsy
- Died: 1770; Ambohimanga
- Burial: Ambohimanga, Rova of Antananarivo (re-interred 1797)
- Spouse: Rasoherimananitany, Renibodonimerina
- Issue: Five sons (Andrianjafy, Andriantsimitoviaminandriandrazaka, Andriankirahinimerina, Andriantsimitovizafinitrimo, Andriamparalahimanjaka) and six daughters (Ranavalonandriambelomasina, Ranavalonjananjanahary, Ranavalonkoandriamanitra, Rabodonimerina, Rafaravavindriambelomasina, Rafaratsimanompo)
- Dynasty: Hova dynasty
- Father: Andriamifonozozoro, Andriantsimitoviaminiandriana Andriandrazaka (adoptive father)
- Mother: Rangorinimerina

Andriambelomasina (ruled 1730–1770) was a Merina King of Imerina Avaradrano, the northern part of the central highlands of Madagascar. The kingdom's capital was located at Ambohimanga.

== Early years ==
Born Rakotomavo ("Yellow Man") at Ambohitrontsy (also Ambohitrosy) to Princess Rangorinimerina and her husband, Prince Andriamifonozozoro. He was the grandson of King Andriamasinavalona of Imerina on his mother's side and was therefore a prince of Imerinatsimo, one of several independent principalities within the borders of the formerly united Merina kingdom. At the time of Rakotomavo's birth, Andriantsimitoviaminiandriana Andriandrazaka was the ruler of Imerina Avaradrano, the easternmost and largest of these Merina principalities. The king's marriages to multiple spouses did not yield heirs, although he was able to father an illegitimate child out of wedlock with a woman of non-noble blood. To satisfy the ancestral requirements establishing legitimacy of a sovereign of Imerina, Andriantsimitoviaminiandriana adopted prince Rakotomavo as his heir. The people of Avaradrano had great difficulty accepting him as their legitimate ruler regardless of the king's wishes.

Upon assuming the kingship on the death of Andriantsimitoviaminiandriana in 1730, Rakotomavo adopted the name Andriambelomasina ("Living Sacred King"). He was also called Andriamaheritsialainolotany ("Strong King Whose Land Cannot Be Stolen").

== Rule ==
The historic fortified village of Ambohidratrimo, one of the twelve sacred hills of Imerina, was the location of Andriambelomasina's capital and rova palace; today, the former location of his palace is marked by a vatolahy monolithic standing stone.

Andriambelomasina initially encountered difficulty establishing acceptance of his rule over Avaradrano. To ensure the loyalty of his people, he concluded a political marriage of alliance with an Avaradrano princess.

The king was interested in re-establishing a unified Imerina by bringing together all the warring principalities of the former kingdom under his rule. This effort was ultimately unsuccessful.

Andriambelomasina's rule was distinguished by the introduction of the first Malagasy mint, which was used to produce tavaiky silver coins based on the model of the Portuguese piastre. Foreign coins had long been a preferred currency in dealings with foreign slavers and traders; monarchs were often buried with these valuable items in a display of their wealth. The venture was not long-lasting, however. Its rapid collapse was likely due to a massive influx of foreign-produced coinage following the economic development of the nearby Mascarene Islands.

He also established a standard measurement called the vata, equivalent to about 15 liters. When Andrianampoinimerina later developed a more complete system of measurements and imposed its use across his realm, he preserved the vata measurement (in slightly modified form) in honor of his grandfather. Andrianampoinimerina decreed that this original vata was to continue to be used in perpetuity in Ikaloy where Andriambelomasina had reigned.

== Family and succession ==
Andriambelomasina had two wives: the first, his principal wife, was Queen Rasoherimananitany; the second was Queen Renidrodonimerina.

Andriambelomasina had three sons. The oldest, Andrianjafy (Andrianjafinandriamanitra), succeeded on the death of his father in 1770 to the throne of Imerina Avaradrano at Ambohimanga. Andrianjafy's brothers were named Andriantsimitoviaminandriana and Andriantsimitovizafinitrimo.

Andriambelomasina was also the grandfather of the great Merina King, Andrianampoinimerina. Believing that the part of the Kingdom of Imerina he ruled was threatened, Andriambelomasina had the strategic idea to marry his daughter Ranavalonanadriambelomasina to the King Andriamiaramanjaka of Ikaloy and Anjafy, a Zafimamy/Alahamadintany Kingdom north of Ambohimanga. The son born of this union, Andrianampoinimerina, would go on to reunify Imerina during his reign and extend his rule beyond the highlands of Madagascar, thereby establishing the basis for the unification of the entire island of Madagascar—an aim pursued and almost completely achieved by Andrianampoinimerina's son Radama I (1810–1831). Before his death, Andriambelomasina declared that his eldest son, Andrianjafy, would succeed him, and that his grandson Andrianampoinimerina would rule after Andrianjafy, thereby establishing the order of succession.

Andriambelomasina died in 1770 and was laid to rest in the family tomb in Ambohimanga inside a coffin made from a hollowed-out tree trunk, in the tradition of the nobles of Imerina at the time. There is a street named after him in Antananarivo.

== Bibliography ==
- Auzias, Dominique; Labourdette, Jean-Paul (2013). Madagascar 2014-2015 (in French). Paris: Petit Futé. ISBN 9782746969728.
- Callet, François (1908). Tantara ny Andriana eto Madagasikara (histoire des rois) (in French). Antananarivo: Imprimerie Catholique.
- Chrétien, J.P. (1999). Histoire d'Afrique (in French). Paris: Karthala Editions. ISBN 9782865379040.
- Dandouau, André; Chapus, G. S. (1952). Histoire des populations de Madagascar (in French). Paris: Larose.
- The Antananarivo Annual and Madagascar Magazine, Volume 4, Issues 13-16. Antananarivo: London Missionary Society Press. 1889.
- Razafiarison, Aina Andrianavalona (2014). Apports des traditions dans les successions royales merina: Madagascar - XVIe - XIXe siècle (in French). Antananarivo: Editions Tsipika. ISBN 9782336347721.
