= Andrianjafy =

King of Imerina-Avaradrano and Imerinatsimo
- Reign: c. 1770–1787
- Predecessor: Andriambelomasina
- Successor: Andrianampoinimerina
- Born: Ambohitrontsy
- Died: 1787; Ilafy
- Burial: Ilafy
- Spouse: Ranavalondrajaka
- Issue: Two sons (Ralaitokana, Ratsiantahana) and one daughter (Ratsimiantahanasoa)
Names
- Andrianjafinandriamanitra
- Dynasty: Hova dynasty
- Father: Andriambelomasina
- Mother: Rasoherimananitany

King Andrianjafy (before c. 1770-1787) also known as Andrianjafinandriamanitra and Andrianjafinjanahary, was the king of Imerina Avaradrano, the northern part of the central highlands of Madagascar with its capital at Ambohimanga. His father Andriambelomasina bequeathed him the rule of Avaradrano while designating his nephew Ramboasalama to follow Andrianjafy in the order of succession. Andrianjafy did not accept this decree, instead preferring that his own son succeed him, and sought retribution against citizens of Avaradrano who acknowledged the latent authority of his nephew.

In order to prevent Ramboasalama from rising to power, Andrianjafy devised a series of failed plans to kill his nephew. The king's ineffectiveness as a ruler and despotic behavior contributed to declining popularity among the people of Avaradrano. Popular support for Ramboasalama produced a coup d'état in which he replaced Andrianjafy as King Andrianampoinimerina. Andrianjafy fled to Ilafy, where he rallied an army and tried unsuccessfully to recapture the throne. He was put to death in 1787 by followers of Andrianampoinimerina.

== Early life ==
Andrianjafy was a son of King Andriambelomasina of Imerina Avaradrano and his first wife, Rasoherimananitany. When he was born, an astrologer made an unfavorable prediction, declaring, "This child will not possess what Andrianjakanavalomandimby and Andriantsimitoviaminiandriana left - he will fritter it away." As a young man he married Ranavalondrajaka of Ilafy, with whom he had two sons, Ralaitokana and Ratsiantahana, and one daughter, Ratsimiantanasoa.

Before his death, King Andriambelomasina assigned his sons to govern four fiefs within the territory, giving the largest and easternmost territory of Avaradrano to Andrianjafy. At the same time he designated his sister's son Ramboasalama to follow Andrianjafy in the order of succession, stating "Ramboasalama will succeed Andrianjafy, because today I give the right to rule to Andrianjafy, but tomorrow and at the end it will belong to Ramboasalama."

== Reign ==
In 1770 Andrianjafy succeeded upon the death of his father, who was one of many victims of a major famine in Imerina. Oral histories recount that Andrianjafy felt his authority was threatened by his nephew Ramboasalama, who frequently made promises to the populace regarding his future reign. Andrianjafy's jealousy prompted him to put to death citizens of his territory who engaged his nephew in such promises. Andrianjafy occasionally displayed his power in despotic fashion, such as by engaging the armies of a Sakalava prince to attack Hiaramy and Faliary, two communities already under his control, and massacring the inhabitants without provocation.

Andrianjafy failed to consistently apply the law in his realm, particularly in regard to the punishment of criminals. The resulting increase in impunity and decline in security in Avaradrano contributed to declining popular support for his rule. The king's public image was further tarnished by his increasingly hostile behavior toward Ramboasalama, in disregard of the wishes of Andrianjafy's father, Andriambelomasina. Oral history describes him as prone to anger and violence, which he did not hesitate to inflict against women and children. He is also said to have frequently seized the property and valuables of his people for his own use without justification or compensation.

== Dethronement ==
Initially, Andrianjafy may have been willing to accept his father's declared order of succession. This most likely changed when Ranavalondrazaka, Andrianjafy's wife, unexpectedly gave birth to a son. She persuaded Andrianjafy to disregard his father's decree and name their own son Ralaitokana as successor in place of Ramboasalama. Andrianjafy agreed to this proposal and devised a series of ruses to kill his nephew and clear the path to the throne for his son. In one instance, Andrianjafy invited his nephew to listen to music from a nearby cliff, intending to push him over the edge; Andriantsimitovizainitrimo, Andrianjafy's brother, warned his nephew of the plot, and Ramboasalama declined the invitation on the pretext of illness. In another instance, Andrianjafy claimed to be ill and sent for Ramboasalama with the intention of murdering him once they were alone together, but once again Andrianjafy's brother warned his nephew of the danger. The king then planned to have Ramboasalama murdered during a planned excursion through a nearby swamp, but Ramboasalama was warned and stayed behind.

Andrianjafy became bolder and decided to send a group of assassins to Ramboasalama's residence in Ambohimanga; confident of his plan, he showed the funeral goods he had prepared for Ramboasalama to his brother, and then departed his stronghold at Ambohimanga for a circumcision ceremony to be held at Ilafy. Andriantsimitovizainitrimo promptly sent a messenger to his nephew instructing him to flee. Rather than leave Ambohimanga, Ramboasalama followed the advice of an elder who instructed him to sacrifice a ram to invoke ancestral protection. The elder then gathered the twelve most respected men of Ambohimanga and thirty soldiers, and rallied them to enforce the decree of Andriambelomasina by overthrowing Andrianjafy and swearing allegiance to Ramboasalama, who took the throne name Andrianampoinimerina. The support of the Tsimahafotsy, inhabitants of Ambohimanga, ensured the defense of the city against efforts by Andrianjafy to reclaim his capital and his authority. Enraged, Andrianjafy took revenge against his brother Andriantsimitovizainitrimo, whom he murdered by pulling him from his bed, which was raised in the traditional style over fifteen feet above the ground.

Andrianjafy rallied the people of his home village of Ilafy to fight against those of Ambohimanga. Both sides were armed with spears and firearms. An initial battle at Marintampona saw the Ilafy army defeated. Both sides regrouped for a second confrontation at Amboniloha, which took place at night and did not end in a definitive win for either side. In the morning, Andrianjafy moved his army north of Anosy and the two sides clashed again in a battle that lasted two days. The Ilafy army lost the skirmish and retreated to their village. After losing these battles, the residents of Ilafy decided to submit to Andrianampoinimerina. To rid themselves of Andrianjafy, the people encouraged him to travel to Antananarivo and Alasora to seek allies in the defense of their town. Once he had departed, the villagers barred the town gates and announced their desire to enforce the decree of Andriambelomasina. Seeking support to recapture the throne, Andrianjafy traveled to Antananarivo, Ambohipeto, Alasora and Anosizato, but each time he was rebuffed.

== Death ==
Having failed to rally an army to retake Ambohimanga, in 1787 Andrianjafy was approached by messengers who claimed they regretted their betrayal and wished to reinstate him as king. The messengers carried him on a royal palanquin to their village in the north, using a circuitous route that disoriented him. He realized too late that the porters had taken him deep into Andrianampoinimerina's territory; they bound him with rope and brought him to his nephew. Andrianampoinimerina was prepared to let his uncle go free after submitting, but the people of Ambohimanga desired vengeance for the violence and injustices the fallen king had inflicted upon them and their families. Andrianampoinimerina took a walk to distract himself while his followers carried Andrianjafy to a nearby location where he was put to death.

Oral history provides different accounts of Andrianjafy's death. He is said to have died either by strangling or by being placed head-first in a vat of rice. His place of death has been given as a valley east of Ambohimanga called Antsahafady, or at the sacred stone of Ambatolava in Ambohimanga village. His body was wrapped in a red lambamena shroud. Different traditions give his place of entombment as Ambohimanatrika in Ilafy, or Isoraka in Antananarivo.

His daughter, who first married King Andrianamboatsimarofy of Imerinatsimo, later married King Andrianampoinimerina upon her first husband's death in 1796.

== Bibliography ==
- Callet, François (1908). Tantara ny Andriana eto Madagasikara (histoire des rois) (in French). Vol. 2. Antananarivo: Imprimerie Catholique.
