= Rova (Madagascar) =

Type of fortified royal complex in Madagascar

A rova is a fortified royal complex built in the central highlands of Madagascar by the Merina of the Andriana (noble) class. The first rova was established at Alasora by king Andriamanelo around 1540 to protect his residence throughout a war with the neighboring Vazimba. Rovas are organized according to traditional symbolic notions of space and enclose the royal residences, the tomb of the founder, and a town square marked with a stone. They are protected with walls, trenches and stone gateways and are planted with fig trees symbolic of royalty.

== History ==
By the 15th century the Merina ethnic group from the southeastern coast had gradually migrated into the central highlands where they established hilltop villages interspersed among existing Vazimba settlements ruled by local kings. King Andriamanelo (1540–1575), the son of Vazimba queen Rafohy and a man of the newly arrived Hova people originating in southeast Madagascar, ultimately led a series of military campaigns against the Vazimba that would eventually drive them from the Highlands, which he and his successors ruled as the Kingdom of Imerina. The conflict that defined his reign also produced many lasting innovations, including the development of fortified villages in the highlands and the establishment of a ruling class of nobles (andriana) in Andriamanelo's line.

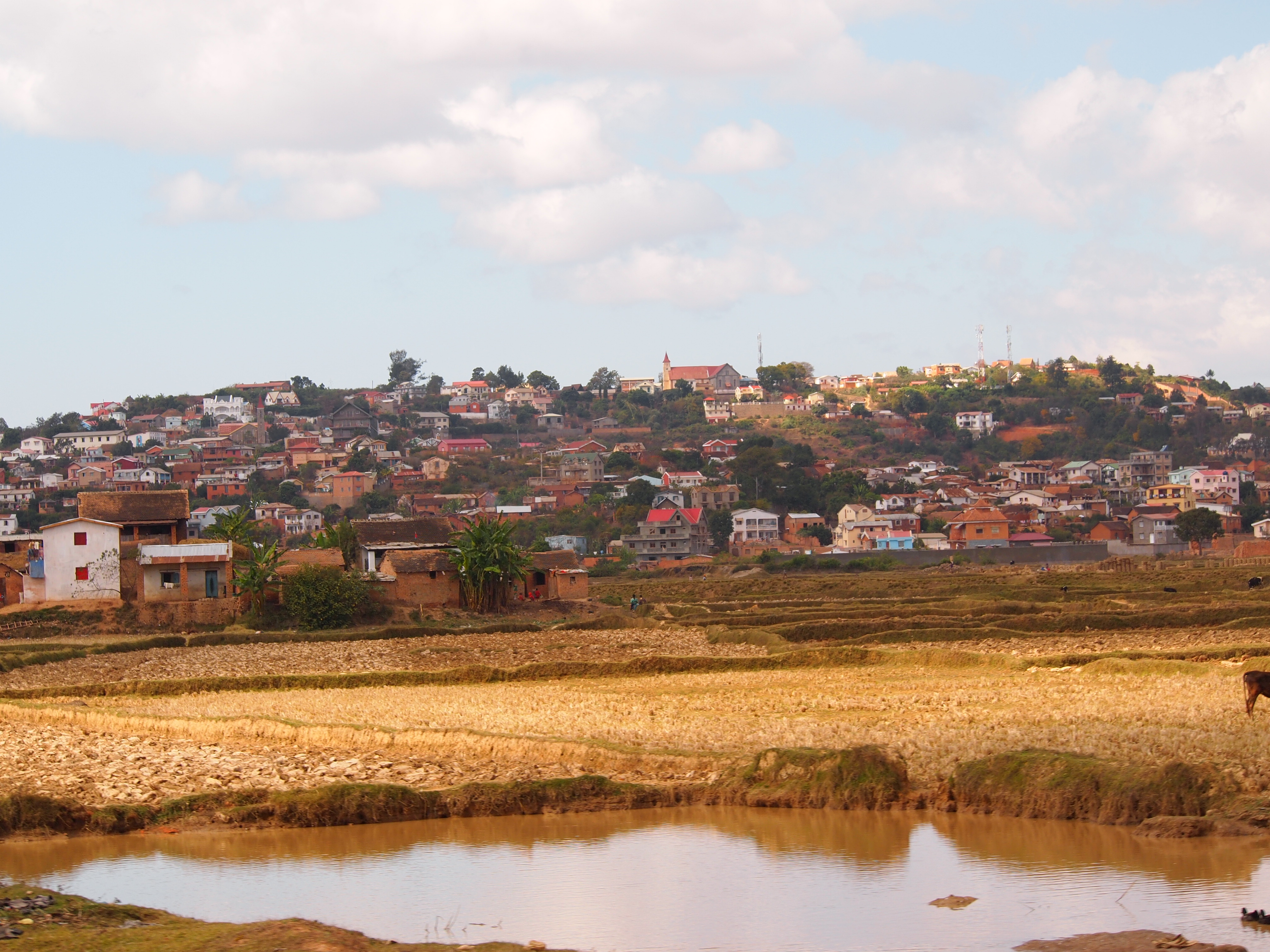
Andriamanelo built the first rova around 1540 at Alasora, a model later copied throughout Imerina.

The first rova was built by Andriamanelo around 1540 at Alasora, 15 km outside of Antananarivo. One of the oldest villages in Imerina, Alasora is believed to have been founded by Prince Ramasimparihy in 1490. Ruling from the neighboring hill of Imerimanjaka, Vazimba Queen Rangita (1500–1520) and her brother Andrianamponga gave the site its current name. Under Rangita's daughter, Queen Rafohy (1520–1540), the capital of the region was moved from Imerimanjaka to Alasora. Her son Andriamanelo added the defensive features of the site, and planted either side of the entry gate with aviavy (fig trees), symbolic of royalty. This rova town model was replicated throughout Imerina. Villages inhabited by the Andriana class typically contained a rova or palace compound.

== Features ==
According to the custom established by Andriamanelo, a rova could only be established by an andriana (noble), who lived and would later be buried within the protected compound. A rova's foundation was always elevated relative to the surrounding village. The compound also always featured a kianja (central courtyard) marked by a vatomasina (tall sacred stone) where the sovereign would stand to deliver kabary (royal speeches or decrees). Contained within the rova was at least one lapa (royal palace or residence) as well as the fasana (tomb) of one or more of the site's founders and family members. The sovereign's lodgings typically stood in the northern part of the rova, while the spouse or spouses lived in the southern part. It was not until the dawn of the 19th century that a perimeter wall of sharpened wooden stakes would constitute another defining feature of rova construction.

Two competing cosmological views coexisted in precolonial Madagascar: an older system that assigned particular values to the cardinal points and the northeast in particular, and a more recent system based on the Zodiac. Rova construction reflects one or both of these systems of symbolic space. The sacred eastern portions often contained structures associated with the veneration of the ancestors, including the royal tombs, basins of holy water used in royal rituals, and Ficus and Draceana trees, which were symbolic of royalty. The northern portion of the site was often where royal judgments were handed down, in line with the Malagasy association between the northern cardinal point, masculinity, and political power. The houses of the royal wives were formerly located in the southern portion of the site, a cardinal point traditionally associated with femininity and spiritual power. In addition, vertical space was given consideration, with higher ground and higher buildings equating greater power or value. Larger rova compounds could consist of two or more adjoined rovas that were sometimes built level with one another, but more commonly placed the newer rova higher than the earlier one to imply the greater power of the current sovereign relative to his predecessors.

Rovas were defended by walls (tamboho) made from the mud and dry rice stalks gathered from nearby paddies, dry moats (hadifetsy) and deep defensive trenches (hadivory), and gateways protected by stone disk portals (vavahady). These defenses were typical of most walled royal compounds of Imerina built between 1525 and 1897 and protected the rova from marauders. Fig trees were planted at the main gate and often within the compound.

High hills with flat areas for the grazing of zebu cattle were preferred sites for the construction of rovas. Natural defensive features such as cliffs or excellent vantage points offered improved protection for the site. Height was symbolic of power, and this concept often manifested in the construction of the rova on the highest suitable hill. The forests at the tops of hills selected for rova construction were considered sacred and were to be preserved intact beyond the perimeters of the town's fortifications. The valleys below the rova were transformed into rice paddies to feed the inhabitants on the hill. The rova itself housed the noble and his kin, while Hova (commoners) lived beyond the city walls on the hill's slopes. The lapa occupied by nobles were constructed of wood and featured a single rectangular room enclosing a hearth and raised platform bed, sheltered by a tall and steep peaked roof typically covered in thatch. The houses of commoners followed a similar form and layout but were constructed of woven grasses, reeds, or other locally available vegetable material.

== Key rovas ==
- Rova of Antananarivo, seat of government for the precolonial Kingdom of Imerina and Kingdom of Madagascar, destroyed by arson in 1995 and under reconstruction in 2013
- Ambohimanga, the best preserved historic rova in Madagascar and a UNESCO World Heritage Site
- Tsinjoarivo, a rova built under Queen Ranavalona I that served as a summer palace for Merina royalty
- Ilafy, a rova inhabited by King Andrianjafy and the site of the tomb of King Radama II
- The former sites of the rovas at the Twelve sacred hills of Imerina, particularly including Alasora (rova of first Merina king Andriamanelo) and Ambohitrabiby (rova of his son, Ralambo)
