= Andriantsimitoviaminiandriana Andriandrazaka =

King of Imerina-Avaradrano and Imandiavato
- Reign: c. 1710–1730
- Predecessor: Andriamasinavalona
- Successor: Andriambelomasina
- Died: c. 1730; Ambohimanga
- Burial: Ambohimanga
- Spouse: Rampanambonitany
- Issue: Five sons and eight daughters, including at least one adopted son (Rakotomavo)
- Dynasty: Hova dynasty
- Father: Andriamasinavalona
- Mother: Ratompoindraoandriana

Andriantsimitoviaminiandriana Andriandrazaka (also Andriantsimitoviaminandriandrazaka) was King of Avaradrano in the central highlands of Madagascar from 1710 to 1730, and King of neighboring Ambohidrabiby after defeating his brother, Andrianavalonimerina. He was a son of Andriamasinavalona, sovereign of the former Kingdom of Imerina, and his wife Ratompoindraoandriana. Sometime during his life Andriantsimitoviaminiandriana adopted Rakotomavo, who would later succeed him as King Andriambelomasina.

As a child, Andriantsimitoviaminiandriana was sent to live in a village that his father named Ambohimanga. As a young man, his father granted him the region of Avaradrano surrounding the village, and while his father still lived he managed the daily affairs of state in Avaradrano without taking the title of king. He declared Ambohimanga the capital of the region, building numerous structures on the site and adding its first set of defensive walls, ditches and gates. The site's historic and cultural significance was recognized in 2001 when UNESCO declared it a World Heritage Site, the only one in the cultural category in Madagascar. He became an independent king upon his father's death and the resulting partition of the Kingdom of Imerina in 1710, from which he received Avaradrano, the easternmost and largest territory. He died around 1730 and was buried at Ambohimanga.

== Early life and family ==
Andriantsimitoviaminiandriana Andriandrazaka was a son of Andriamasinavalona, monarch of the former Kingdom of Imerina, and his wife Queen Ratompoindraoandriana. As a child, Andriantsimitoviaminiandriana was sent to live in a village that his father named Ambohimanga, where he occupied a house at a place called Mahazaza.

As a young man, he married Rampanambonitany. Oral history provides two conflicting accounts of their marriage. According to one version, the couple had no children of their own, leading the king to adopt the eight daughters and five sons of his sister Rangorinimerina. In another version, at least some of the five sons and eight daughters issued from the king's marriage, and his son Rakotomavo was adopted from a woman called Rangorimanana. The remaining four sons were named Andriantoarana, Andriamohara, Ratsimanjaka and Andriampalimana, after the king's pet donkeys. The names of only three of his eight daughters are preserved in the oral histories: Randriamizaza, Rahisatra and Rahira.

=== Adoption of Rakotomavo ===
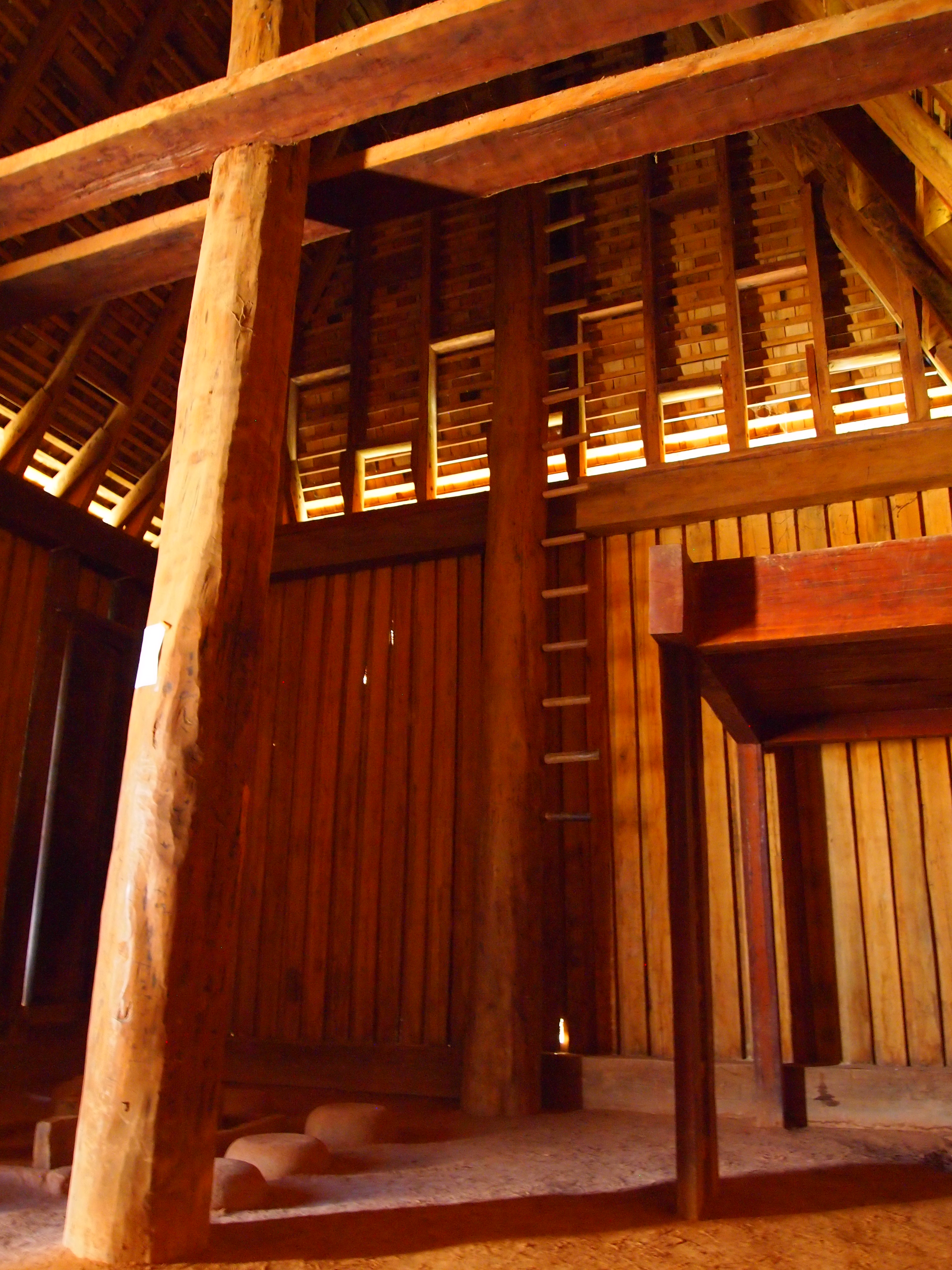
The king chose to adopt Rakotomavo because he stood closer to the central pillar of the house (andry), a symbol of strength.

Two accounts exist regarding the adoption of Rakotomavo, whom Andriantsimitoviaminiandriana designated to rule after him as King Andriambelomasina. According to the first version, Rakotomavo and Andriamohara were sons of Rangorimanana. Andriantsimitoviaminiandriana sent messengers to Ranorimanana to bring the boys to him with the instructions to take note of which child stood closer to the central pillar (andry, symbolic of strength) of their mother's house. When the boys entered the house, Rakotomavo stood closer to the pillar. The children's relatives refused to allow the messengers to take the children, so the king sent them back with rice, milk, honey and other goods and successfully lured the boys away.

In another version of the story, the king adopted all of the children of his sister Rangorimanana. He then devised a test to determine which one would succeed him. He requested his messengers to bring the children a package including lemons, meat, honey, rice, milk and a reed, and to note which child took the reed and stood near the central pillar of the house; this child was Rakotomavo.

Andriantsimitoviaminiandriana selected Rakotomavo to succeed him and assigned the child to be the guardian of his sacred zebu herd. Members of the powerful Tsimahafotsy clan of Ambohimanga declared that his throne name would be Andriambelomasina.

== Reign ==
Andriantsimitoviaminiandriana became an independent king upon his father's death in 1710 and the consequent partition of the Kingdom of Imerina, from which he received the eastern quadrant of Avaradrano, the largest piece. He established his capital at the village of Ambohimanga; the cultural and historical significance of this site was recognized by UNESCO in 2001 when it was declared Madagascar's first cultural World Heritage Site. Throughout his reign as King of Avaradrano (1710–1730), Andriantsimitoviaminiandriana fought to strengthen the authority of his governance at Ambohimanga and attract residents to settle in the surrounding villages while battling his brothers to increase the land under his control.

=== Expansion and management of territory ===
The expansion of Andriantsimitoviaminiandriana's realm began with the capture of his brother Andrianavalonimerina's territory, which he ruled from Ambohitrabiby. The king led his brother to believe that they were on friendly terms and that they should work together to support one another. When the king launched a surprise attack on Ambohitrabiby, his brother was unprepared to deflect the offensive and Andriantsimitoviaminiandriana successfully seized control of the territory, which he incorporated into his own.

Andriantsimitoviaminiandriana gave four of his sons fiefdoms to rule. His son Andriantoarana was given Alasora and lived there with his brother Andriamohara, who was not given a fief of his own to rule. He gave Ratsimanjaka the fief of Anosiarivo and designated Andriampalimana to rule at Tsirangaina. Andriantsimitoviaminiandriana gave his adoptive son Rakotomavo the capital of Ambohimanga to rule after his death; Rakotomavo succeeded Andriantsimitoviaminiandriana as King Andriambelomasina.

=== Fortification of Ambohimanga ===
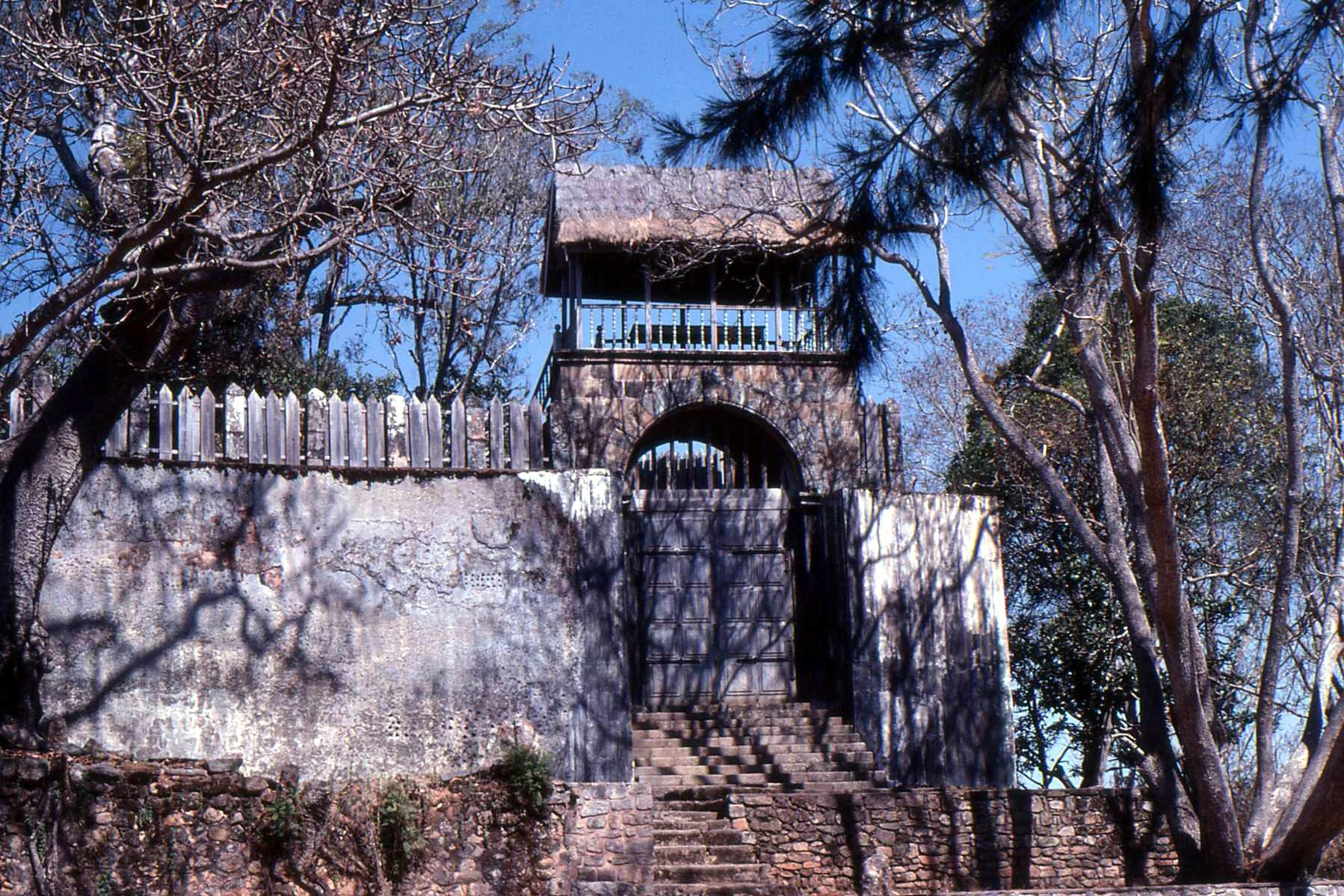
Andriantsimitoviaminiandriana expanded Ambohimanga and strengthened its defenses.

Andriantsimitoviaminiandriana was the first to systematically establish a network of defenses around the royal residence on the hilltop of Ambohimanga. He built the site's defensive walls and its first set of seven gates. He also undertook three expansions of the settlement, beginning with the expansion of Bevato, which he surrounded by trenches, and the creation of a southern gateway called Ambavahadikely. This expansion was followed by the construction of trenches bordering a second adjoining space to the northeast with three access points. These he named Ambavahadikely, Ampanidinamporona, and Ambavahaditsiombiomby, the latter a natural gateway formed by two boulders. Andriantsimitoviaminiandriana then expanded toward the west to a series of natural defenses, including stony cliffs and steep forested slopes that obviated the need to dig defensive trenches; he instead constructed several additional gates which he named Ambavahadimahazaza, Andranomboahangy and Ambavahadiantandranomasina. In addition, the king sanctified a number of stones on the site. A stone he named Fidasiana became the site where all future sovereigns were to stand during their enthronement ceremony. He laid this stone at Ambohimanga with Andriamborona, the hill's first permanent occupant, in honor of Andriamborona's willingness to vacate the hill for the establishment of Andriantsimitoviaminiandriana's capital. The king buried white and red pearls and a piastre beneath the stone, sacrificed a zebu on it, and declared that it would thereafter ensure the protection and sanctity of Ambohimanga. He also assigned two other stones at Manganihany and Antsahamasina key roles in the royal circumcision ceremony.

=== Decrees ===
This king established a number of enduring traditions in Imerina. A law imposing a fine on a homeowner whose house fire destroys neighboring property was promulgated by Andriantsimitoviaminiandriana. He also established the rule that all citizens of Ambohimanga or Antananarivo should pass to offer hasina to the sovereign and wish him or her a long life if a fire ever broke out in their city, and that citizens should likewise congratulate the owners of houses that were spared from destruction if a fire had occurred nearby. He designated specific areas where water could be drawn for use in royal circumcision ceremonies. Andriantsimitoviaminiandriana also created three formal ways of pronouncing a sacred and binding oath; these included the mively rano (striking the surface of a body of water with a stick), the milefon'omby (striking a calf with a spear) and the misotro vokaka (drinking water mixed with ashes taken from a king's tomb). After capturing Ambohitrabiby, he obliged all the andriana (nobles) and other powerful figures in the community there to formalize their allegiance to him by enacting one of these oaths.

== Death ==
Andriantsimitoviaminiandriana died around 1730 at Ambohimanga. His successor, King Andriambelomasina, entombed him at the Mahandrihono compound within the rova at Ambohimanga.

== Bibliography ==
- Callet, François (1908). Tantara ny andriana eto Madagasikara (histoire des rois) (in French). Antananarivo: Imprimerie catholique.
- Campbell, Gwyn (2012). David Griffiths and the Missionary "History of Madagascar". Leiden, the Netherlands: Brill. ISBN 978-90-04-20980-0.
- Labourdette, Jean-Paul; Auzias, Dominique (2011). Madagascar (in French). Paris: Petit Futé. ISBN 978-2-7469-4029-1.
