= Hasina (Madagascar) =

Concept of sanctity and imbued authority in Malagasy culture

Hasina is the concept of sanctity and imbued authority in the traditional culture of Madagascar. It is a spiritual quality that was the essence of social and political organization against the forces of disorder and wilderness, and evolved into the concept of kingship. Jan Vansina called hasina "the whole ideology of kingship". An individual is believed to be imbued with hasina, which can be augmented or diminished by their actions or by the tribute or authority conceded to them by others. Rulers in traditional society were the ultimate embodiment of hasina, whereas community leaders and heads of families possessed relatively less. The same term, hasina, was used to describe tributes given to political leaders, which in the 19th century Kingdom of Imerina typically took the form of a silver coin and accompanying prayer.
