= Ilafy =

- Location in Madagascar
- Coordinates: 17°53′S 48°25′E
- Country: Madagascar
- Region: Alaotra-Mangoro
- District: Ambatondrazaka
- Elevation: 845 m (2,772 ft)

Population (2001)
  - Total: 13,000
- Time zone: UTC3 (EAT)

Ilafy is a town and commune (Malagasy: kaominina) in Madagascar. It belongs to the district of Ambatondrazaka, which is a part of Alaotra-Mangoro Region. The population of the commune was estimated to be approximately 13,000 in 2001 commune census.

Primary and junior level secondary education are available in town. The majority 96% of the population of the commune are farmers, while an additional 1% receives their livelihood from raising livestock. The most important crop is rice, while other important products are cassava, sweet potatoes and bambara groundnut. Industry and services provide employment for 0.5% and 1.5% of the population, respectively. Additionally fishing employs 1% of the population.

Ilafy is of historical and cultural significance, widely considered one of the twelve sacred hills of Imerina.
