= Tantara ny Andriana eto Madagasikara =

Book on the Kingdom of Imerina (Madagascar)

Tantara ny Andriana eto Madagasikara (History of the Nobles in Madagascar) is a book recording the oral traditions of the Kingdom of Imerina in Madagascar, gathered and published by Father François Callet between 1878 and 1881. This collection of oral tradition about the history of the Merina Dynasty was originally written in Malagasy and published between 1878 and 1881. Callet summarized and translated it in French under the title Tantara ny Andriana (Histoire des rois) in 1908.

Much of what is known about the sovereigns of the Kingdom of Imerina comes from Father François Callet's book. Tantara ny Andriana constitutes the core material for the historians studying the Merina history, and ever since its publication has been commented upon, criticized and challenged by numerous historians from Madagascar, Europe and North America (see for example: Rasamimanana, 1930; Ravelojaona et al., 1937; Ramilison, 1951; Kent, 1970; Délivré, 1974; Berg 1988; and Larson, 2000). The work is complemented by oral traditions of other tribes collected by Malagasy historians.
