= Culture of Madagascar =

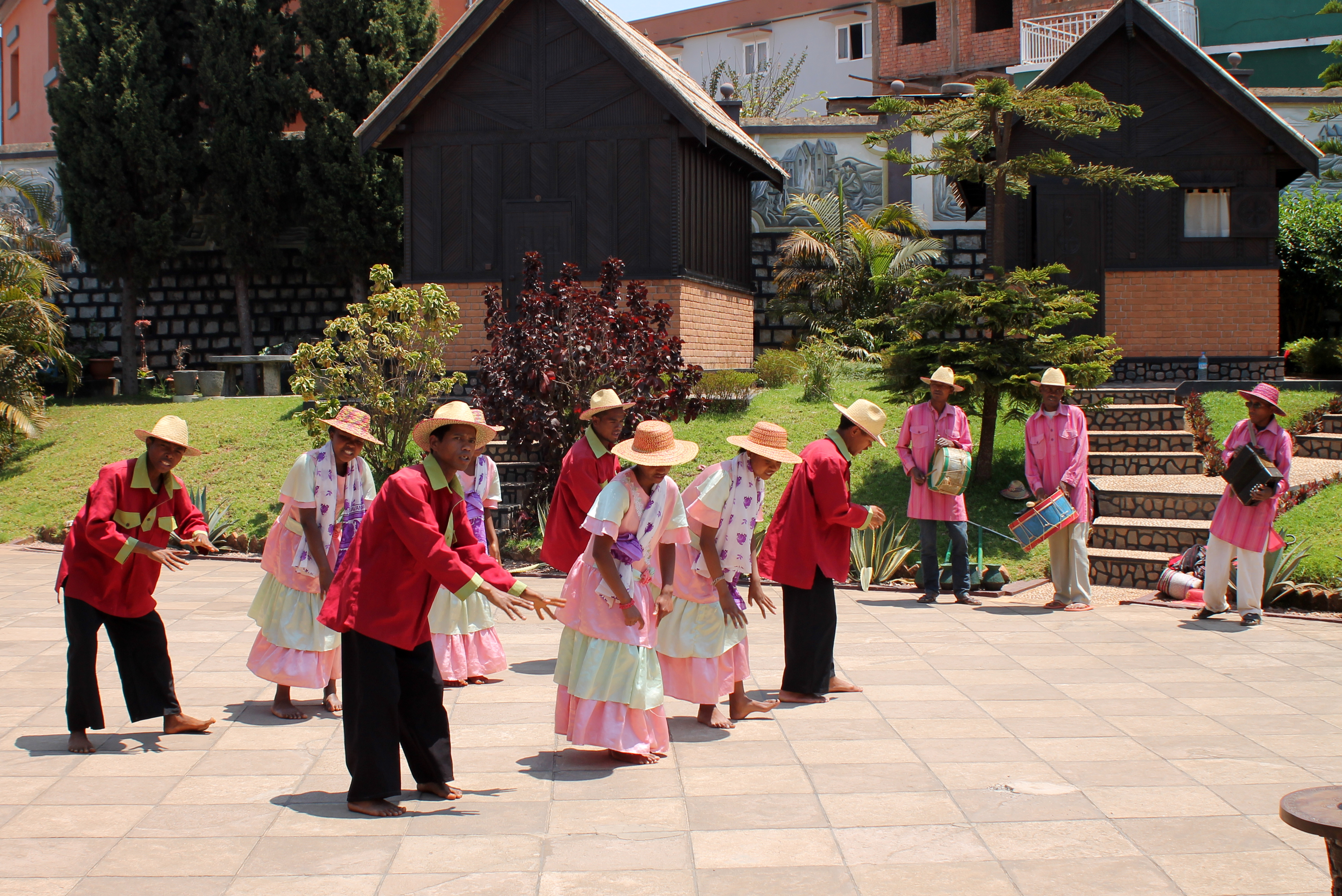
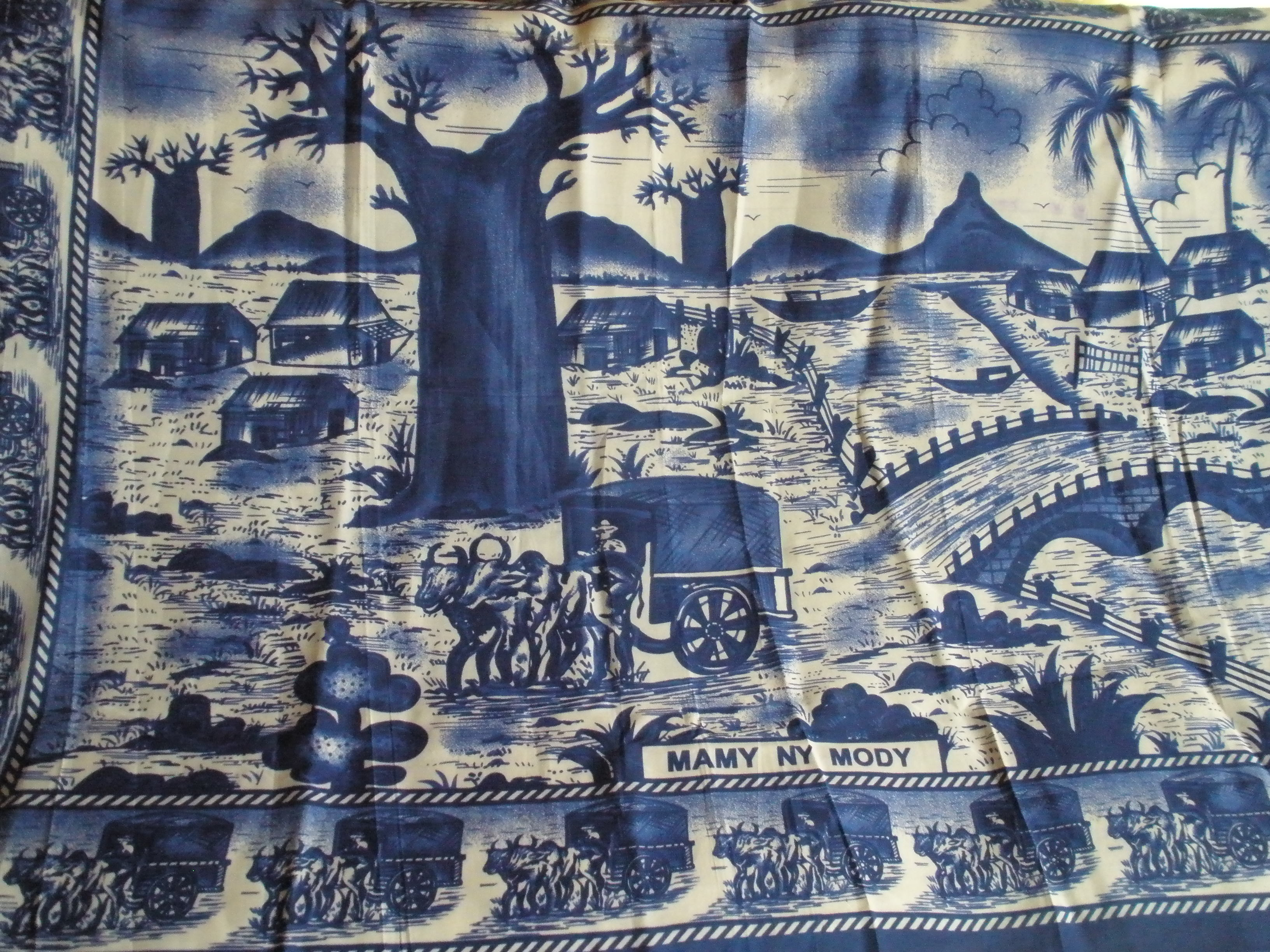
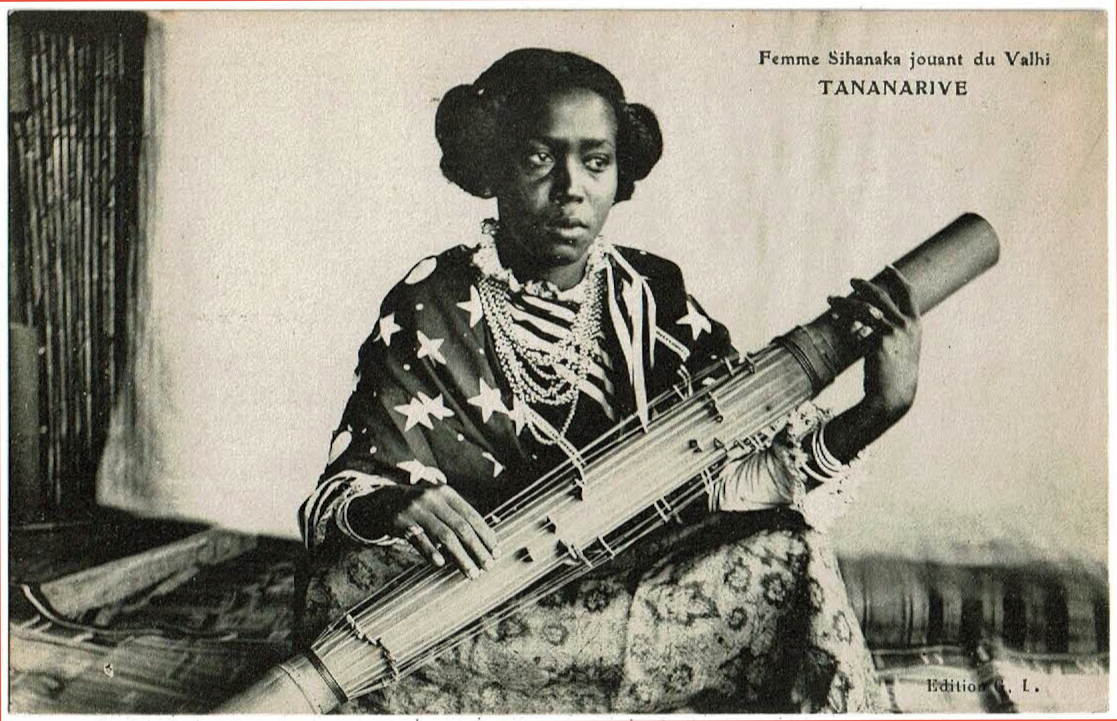
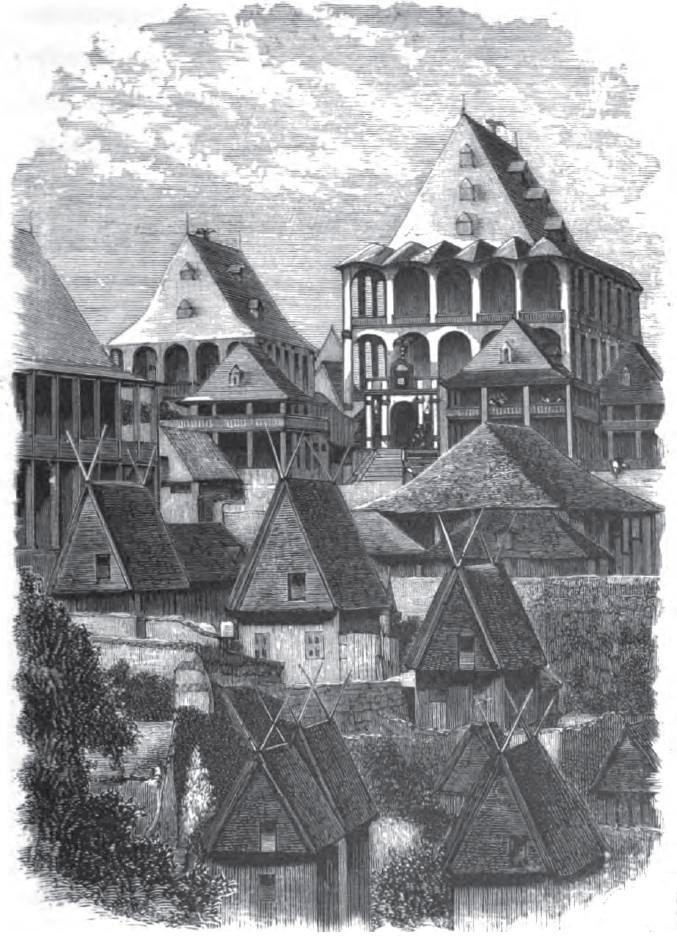
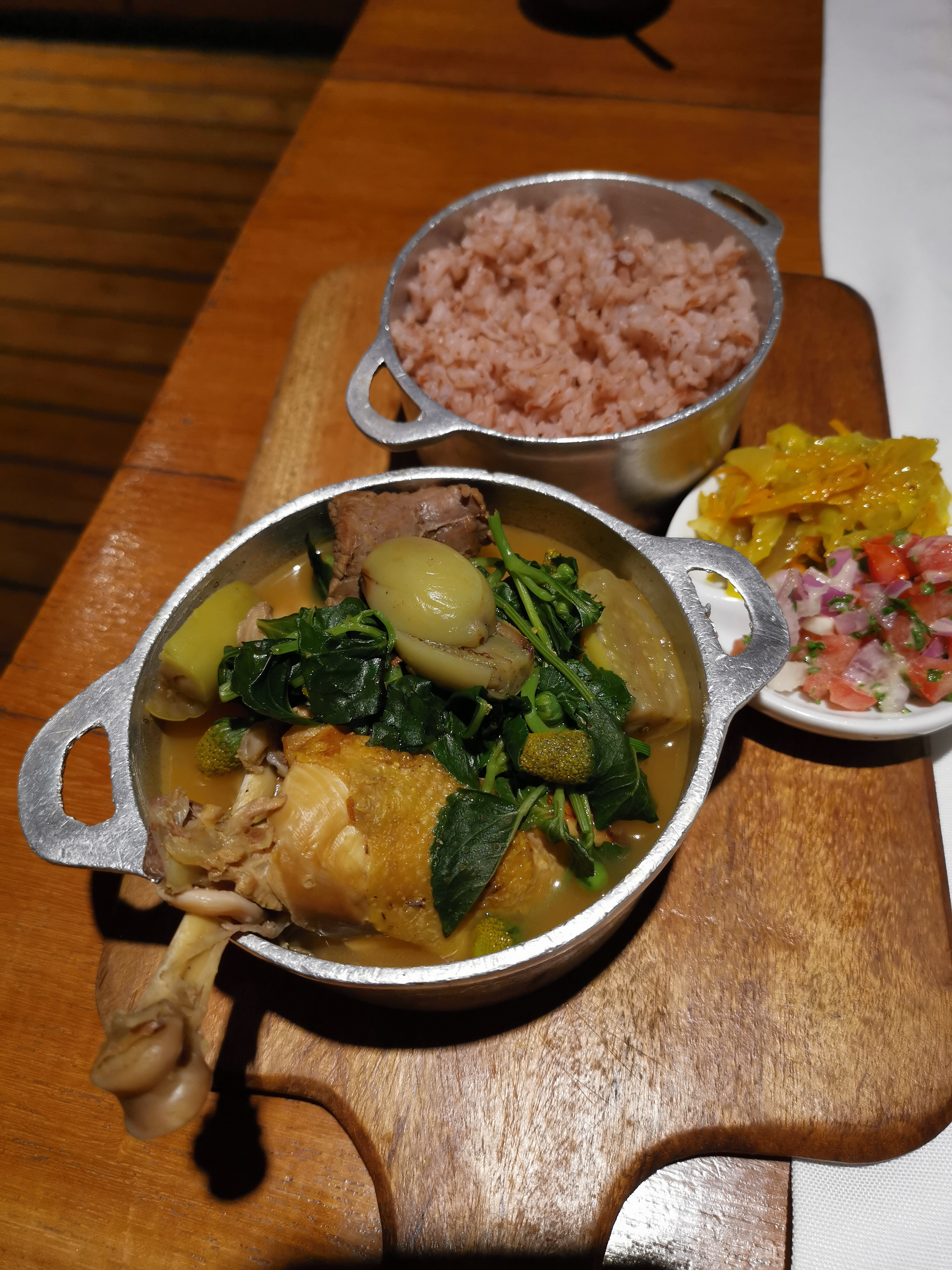
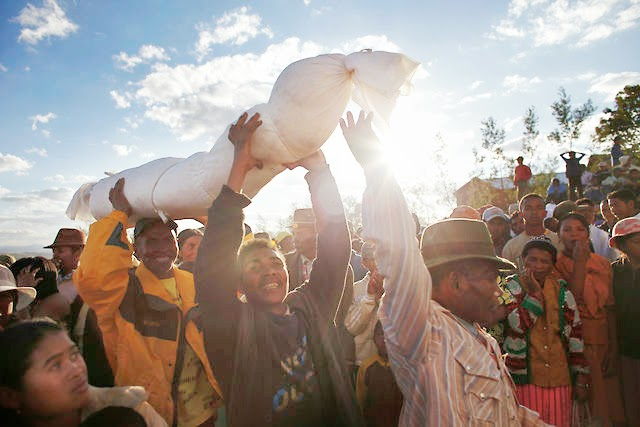
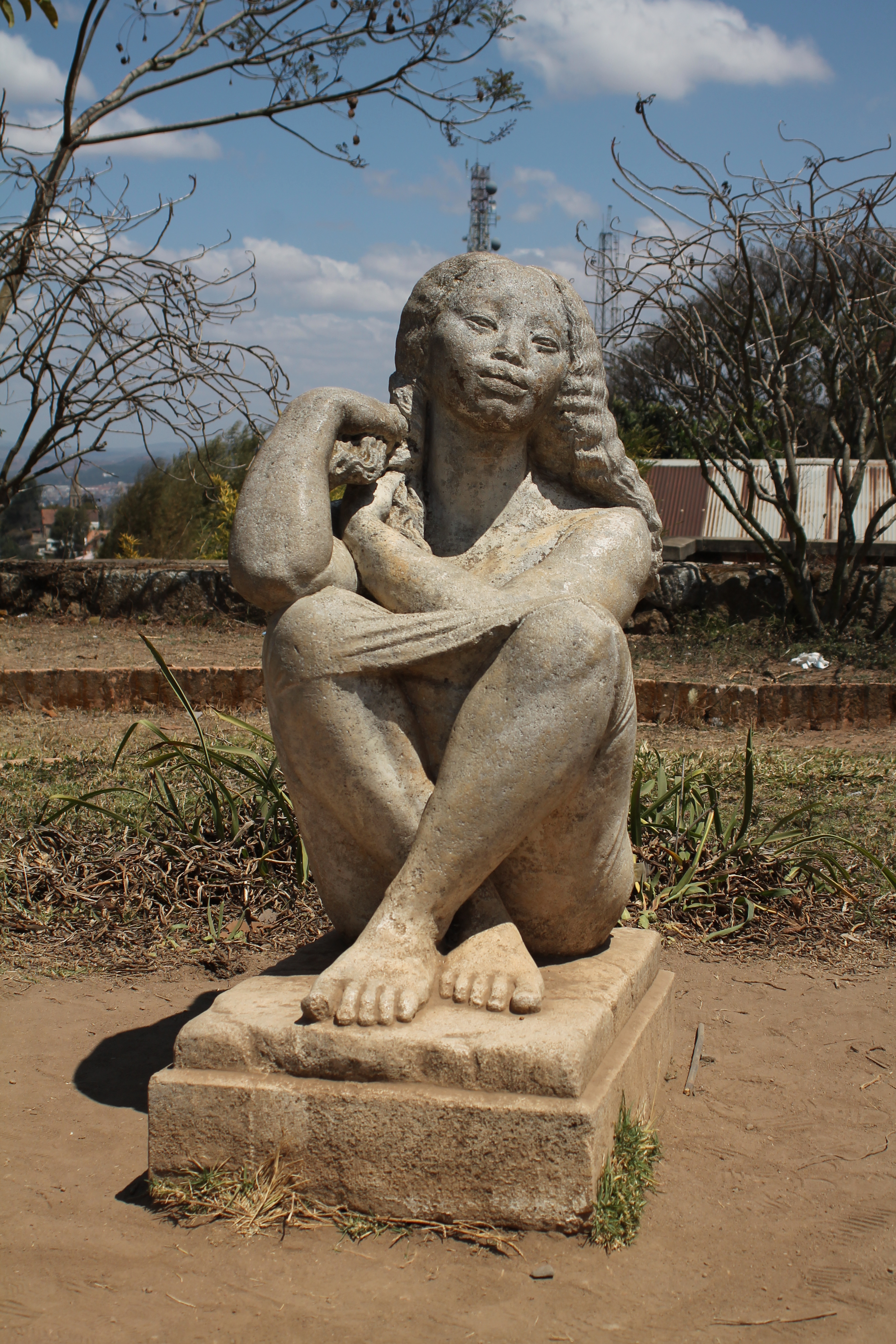
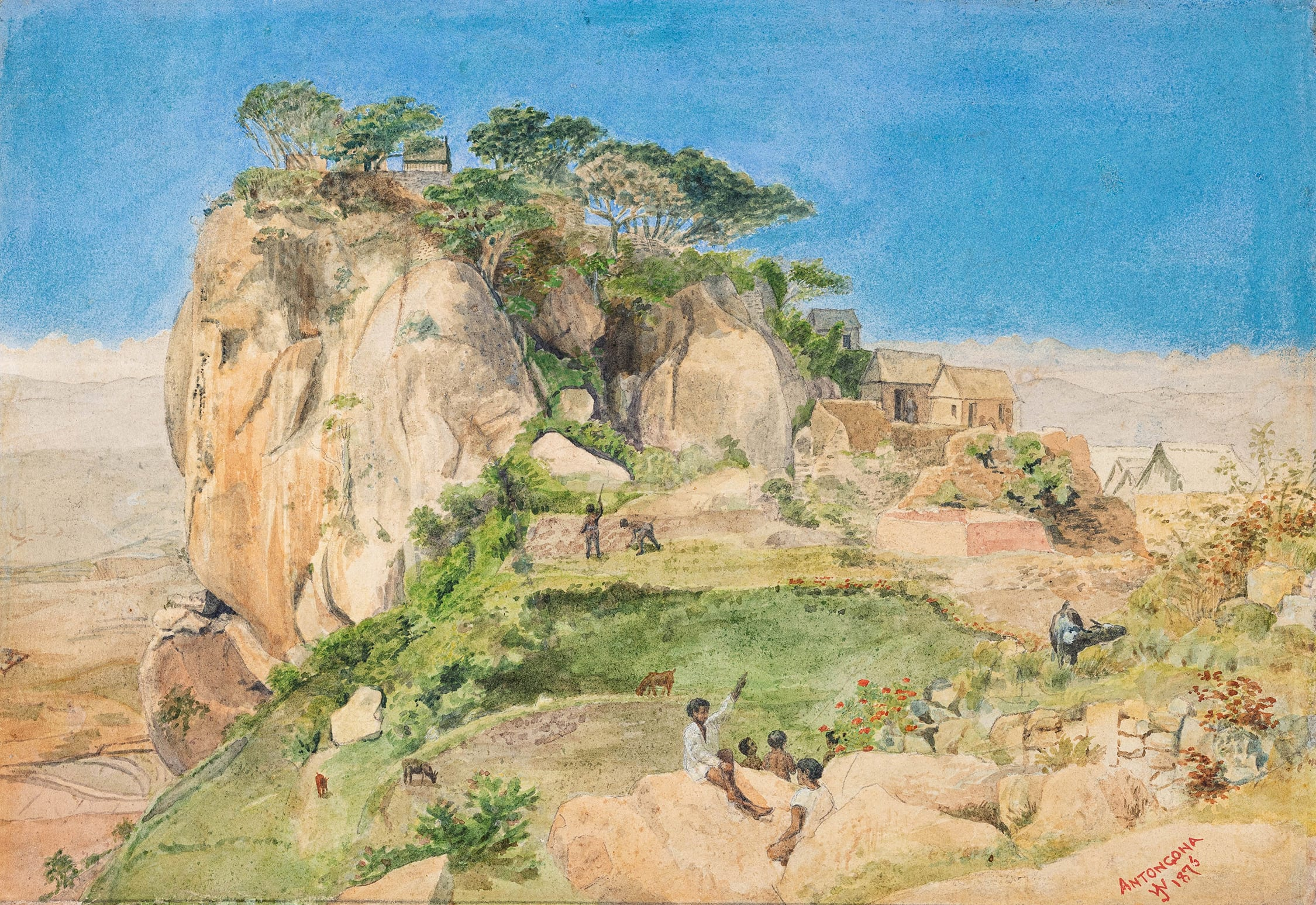
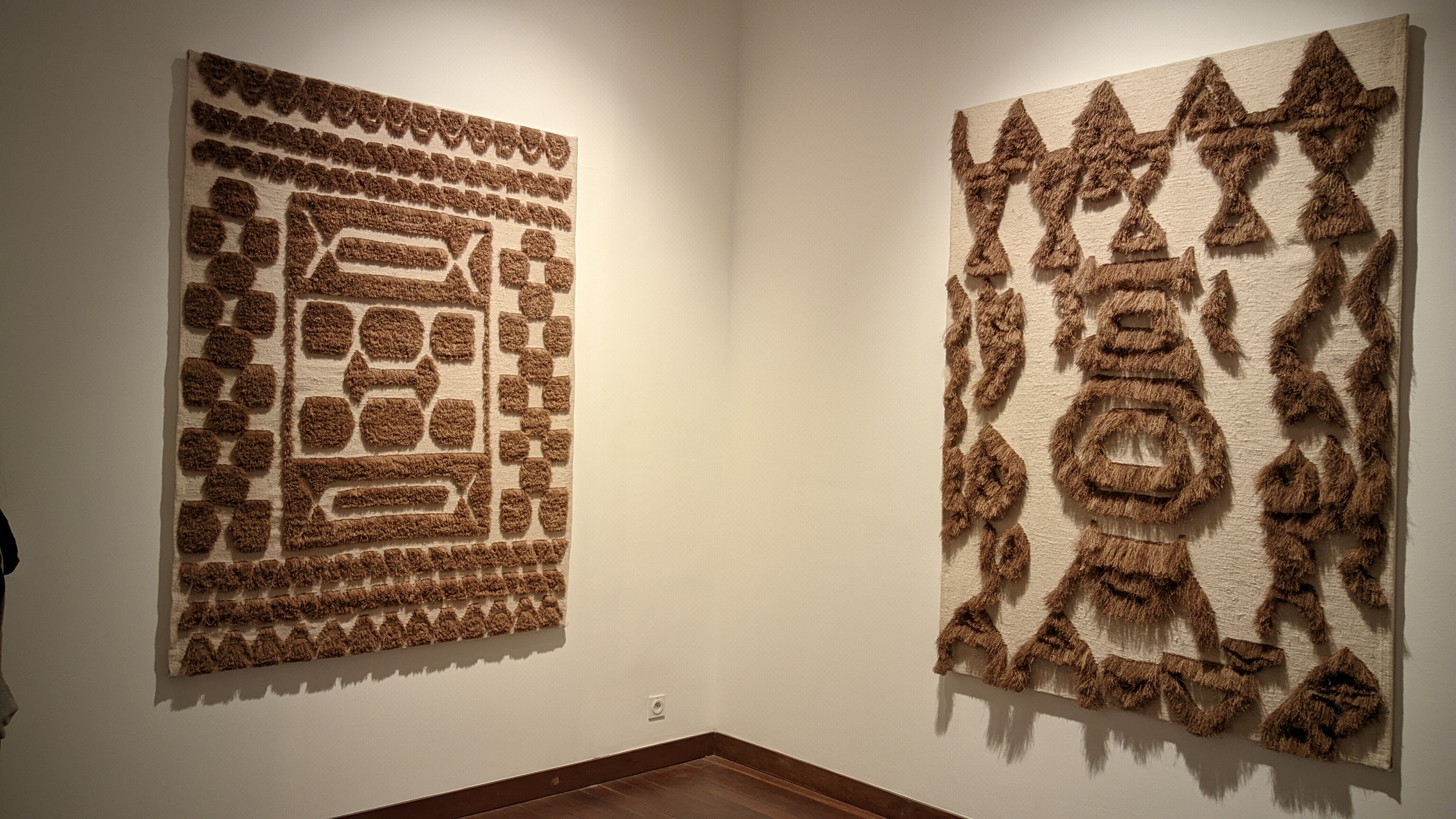
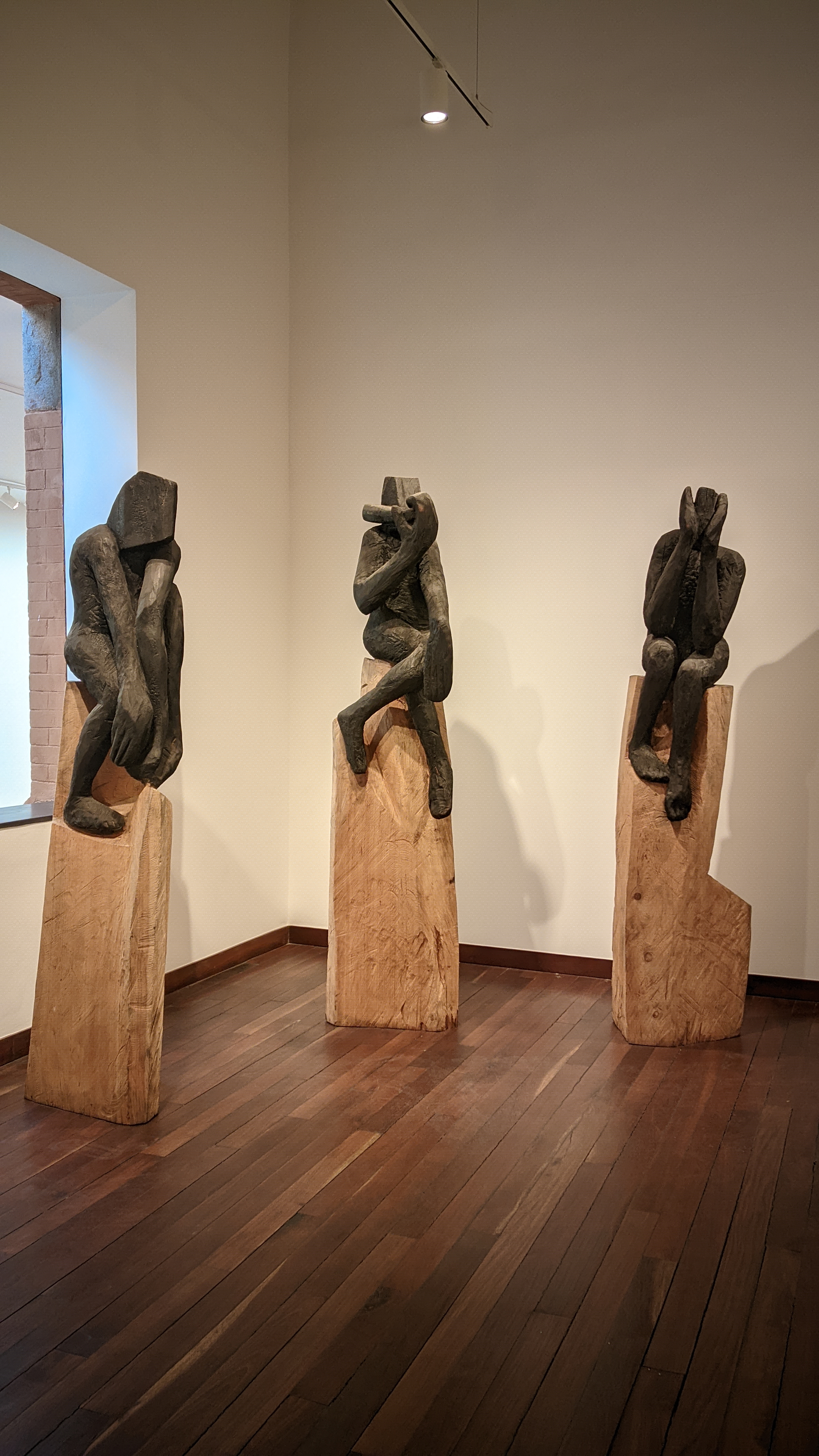

The culture of Madagascar reflects the origins of the Malagasy people in Southeast Asia, East Africa and Oceania. The influence of Arabs, Indians, British, French and Chinese settlers is also evident.

The most emblematic musical instrument of Madagascar, the valiha, is a bamboo tube zither carried to the island by early settlers from southern Borneo, and is very similar in form to those found in Indonesia and the Philippines today. Traditional houses in Madagascar are likewise similar to those of southern Borneo in terms of symbolism and construction, featuring a rectangular layout with a peaked roof and central support pillar. Reflecting a widespread veneration of the ancestors, tombs are culturally significant in many regions and tend to be built of more durable material, typically stone, and display more elaborate decoration than the houses of the living.

The production and weaving of silk can be traced back to the island's earliest settlers, and Madagascar's national dress, the woven lamba, has evolved into a varied and refined art. The Southeast Asian cultural influence is also evident in Malagasy cuisine, in which rice is consumed at every meal, typically accompanied by one of a variety of flavorful vegetable or meat dishes.

African influence is reflected in the sacred importance of zebu cattle and their embodiment of their owner's wealth, traditions originating on the African mainland. Cattle rustling, originally a rite of passage for young men in the plains areas of Madagascar where the largest herds of cattle are kept, has become a dangerous and sometimes deadly criminal enterprise as herdsmen in the southwest attempt to defend their cattle with traditional spears against increasingly armed professional rustlers.

== Worldview and religions ==
Religion in Madagascar (2020) according to the Pew Research Center
1. Christian (85.4%)
2. Folk religions (4.60%)
3. Muslim (3.00%)
4. Unaffiliated/Other (7.00%)

=== Traditional worldview ===
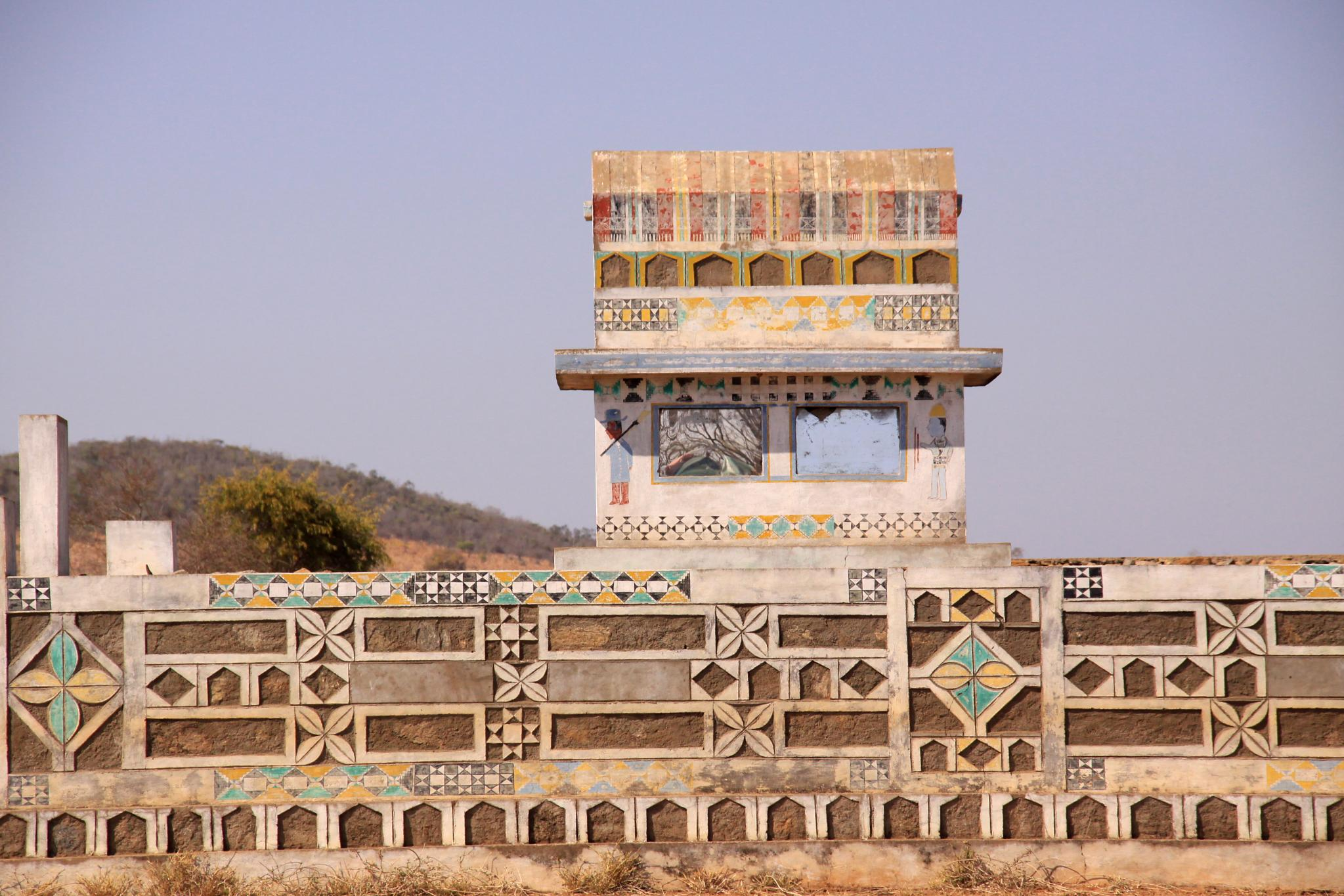
Mahafaly tomb with traditional painted decoration

4.6% of the Island's population is solely adherent to the traditional religion of Fomba-gasy, which tends to emphasize links between the living and the razana (ancestors). The veneration of ancestors has led to the widespread tradition of tomb building, as well as the highlands practice of the famadihana, whereby a deceased family member's remains may be exhumed to be periodically re-wrapped in fresh silk shrouds before being replaced in the tomb. The famadihana is an occasion to celebrate the beloved ancestor's memory, reunite with family and community, and enjoy a festive atmosphere. Across the island, many Malagasy make offerings out of respect to the ancestors, such as by pouring the first cap-full of each newly opened bottle of rum into the northeastern corner of the room.

Consideration for ancestors is also demonstrated through adherence to fady, taboos that are respected during and after the lifetime of the person who establishes them. It is widely believed that by showing respect for ancestors in these ways, they may intervene on behalf of the living. Conversely, misfortunes are often attributed to ancestors whose memory or wishes have been neglected. The sacrifice of zebu is a traditional method used to appease or honor the ancestors. In addition, the Malagasy traditionally believe in a creator god, called Zanahary or Andriamanitra.

=== Social structure and values ===
Each of the many ethnic sub-groups in Madagascar adhere to their own set of beliefs, practices and ways of life that have historically contributed to their unique identities. However, there are a number of core cultural features that are common throughout the island, creating a strongly unified Malagasy cultural identity. In addition to a common language and shared traditional religious beliefs around a creator god and veneration of the ancestors, the traditional Malagasy worldview is shaped by values that emphasize fihavanana (solidarity), vintana (destiny), tody (karma), and hasina, a sacred life force that traditional communities believe imbues and thereby legitimates authority figures within the community or family. Other cultural elements commonly found throughout the island include the practice of male circumcision; strong kinship ties; a widespread belief in the power of magic, diviners, astrology and witch doctors; and a traditional division of social classes into nobles, commoners, and slaves.

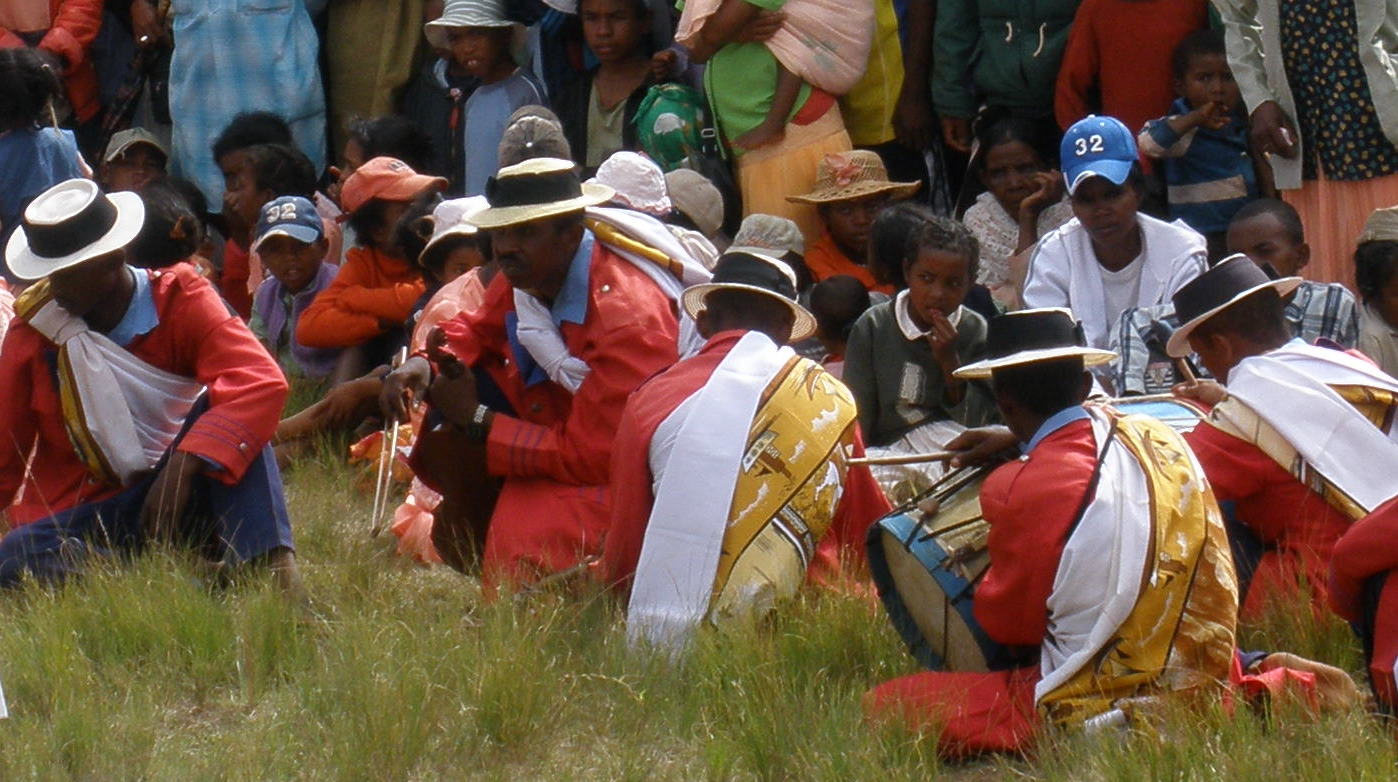
Hiragasy musicians wearing coordinating lambas

Although social castes are no longer legally recognized, ancestral caste affiliation often continues to affect social status, economic opportunity and roles within the community. Malagasy people traditionally consult Mpanandro ("Makers of the Days") to identify the most auspicious days for important events such as weddings or famadihana, according to a traditional astrological system introduced by Arabs. Similarly, the nobles of many Malagasy communities in the pre-colonial period would commonly employ advisers known as the ombiasy (from olona-be-hasina, "man of much virtue") of the southeastern Antemoro ethnic group, who trace their ancestry back to early Somali settlers.

=== Introduced religions ===
Majority of the Malagasy population adheres to Christianity, with practitioners of Protestantism slightly outnumbering adherents to Roman Catholicism. Today, most Malagasy Christians integrate their religious beliefs with traditional ones related to honoring their ancestors. For instance, they may bless their dead at church before proceeding with traditional burial rites or invite a Christian minister to consecrate a famadihana reburial.

Many Malagasy believe they are descended from ancient Israelites and refer to a Malagasy Jewish diaspora (Diaspora Jiosy Gasy), with asserted signs such as dietary, menstrual, and life-cycle practices. In 2011, a normative Jewish movement was started and soon recognized by the government.

Islam is practiced by around 3% of the population, with practitioners largely concentrated in the northwestern provinces of Mahajanga and Antsiranana. The vast majority of Muslims are Sunni and are divided between those of Malagasy ethnicity, Indians, Pakistanis and Comorians. More recently, Hinduism was introduced to Madagascar through Gujarati people immigrating from the Saurashtra region of India in the late 19th century.

=== Perception of time ===
The Malagasy people of Madagascar see time in a cyclical manner. They imagine the future as flowing into the back of their heads, or passing them from behind, then becoming the past as it stretches out in front of them. The past is in front of their eyes because it is visible, known and influential. They can look at it, enjoy it, learn from it, even "play" with it.

In his 1915 book A naturalist in Madagascar, naturalist James Sibree published the following table of Malagasy terms used to refer to times of day and night:

Malagasy term	English translation	Time of day (approximate)
Mamaton’ alina	Centre of night	12:00 AM; midnight
Misasaka alina	Halving of night	12:00 AM; midnight
Maneno sahona	Frog croaking	2:00 AM
Maneno akoho	Cock-crowing	3:00 AM
Maraina alina koa	Morning also night	4:00 AM
Maneno goaika	Crow croaking	5:00 AM
Manga vodilanitra	Bright horizon	5:15 AM
Mangoan’ atsinanana	Reddish East	5:15 AM
Mangiran-dratsy	Glimmer of day	5:15 AM
Ahitan-tsoratr’ omby	Colors of cattle can be seen	5:30 AM
Mazava ratsy	Dusk	5:30 AM
Mifoha lo-maozoto	Diligent people awake	5:30 AM
Maraina koa	Early morning	5:30 AM
Vaky masoandro	Sunrise	6:00 AM
Vaky andro	Daybreak	6:00 AM
Piakandro	Daybreak	6:00 AM
Antoandro be nanahary	Broad daylight	6:00 AM
Efa bana ny andro	Broad daylight	6:00 AM
Mihintsana ando	Dew-falls	6:15 AM
Mivoaka omby	Cattle go out (to pasture)	6:15 AM
Maim-bohon-dravina	Leaves are dry (from dew)	6:30 AM
Afa-dranom-panala (Note: Used only in the winter months)	Hoar-frost disappears	6:45 AM
Manara vava nya ndro (Note: Used only in the winter months)	The day chills the mouth	6:45 AM
Misandratra andro	Advance of the day	8:00 AM
Mitatao haratra	Over (at a right angle with) the purlin	9:00 AM
Mitatao vovonana	Over the ridge of the roof	12:00 PM; noon
Mandray tokonana ny andro	Day taking hold of the threshold	12:30 PM
Mitsidika andro	Peeping-in of the day	1:00 PM
Latsaka iray dia ny andro	Day less one step	1:00 PM
Solafak’ andro	Slipping of the day	1:30 PM – 2:00 PM
Solafak’ andro	Slipping of the day	2:00 PM
Tafalatsaka ny andro	Decline of the day	2:00 PM
Mihilana ny andro	Decline of the day	2:00 PM
Am-pitotoam-bary	At the rice-pounding place	2:00 PM
Mby amin’ ny andry ny andro	At the house post	2:00 PM
Am-pamatoran-janak’ omby	At the place of tying the calf	3:00 PM
Mby am-pisoko ny andro	At the sheep or poultry pen	4:00 PM
Mody omby tera-bao	The cow newly calved comes home	4:30
Tafapaka ny andro	Sun touching (i.e. the eastern wall)	5:00
Mody omby	Cattle come home	5:30
Mena masoandro	Sunset flush	5:45
Maty masoandro	Sunset (lit. "Sun dead")	6:00
Miditra akoho	Fowls come in	6:15
Somambisamby	Dusk; twilight	6:30
Maizim-bava-vilany	Edge of rice-cooking pan obscure	6:45
Manokom-bary olona	People begin to cook rice	7:00
Homan-bary olona	People eat rice	8:00
Tapi-mihinana	Finished eating	8:30
Mandry olona	People go to sleep	9:00
Tapi-mandry olona	Everyone in bed	9:30
Mipoa-tafondro	Gun-fire	10:00

== Language ==
The Malagasy language is of Malayo-Polynesian origin and is generally spoken throughout the island. The numerous dialects of Malagasy, which are generally mutually intelligible, can be clustered under one of two sub-groups: eastern Malagasy, spoken along the eastern forests and highlands including the Merina dialect of Antananarivo; and western Malagasy, spoken across the western coastal plains. French became the official language during the colonial period, when Madagascar came under the authority of France. In the first national Constitution of 1958, Malagasy and French were named the official languages of the Malagasy Republic. Madagascar is a francophone country, and French is mostly spoken as a second language among the educated population and used for international communication.

== Art ==
=== Visual arts ===
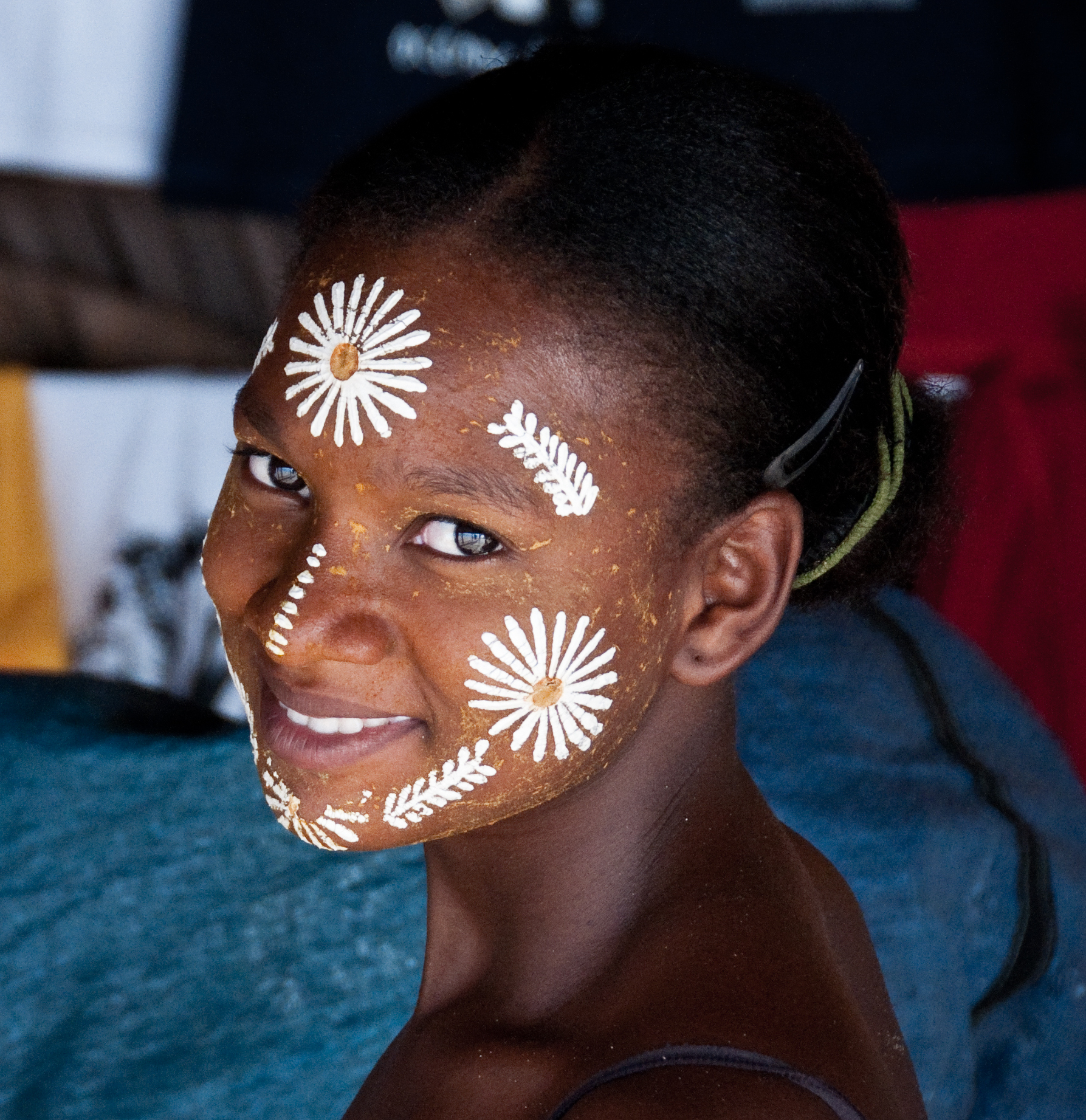
Malagasy girl in Nosy Be wearing masonjoany, an endemic decorative and protective paste made from ground wood

Traditional arts are based on the creative use of local and natural materials. The tradition of silk weaving and lamba production exemplifies this form of art. The weaving of raffia and other local plant materials has been used to create a wide array of practical items such as floor mats, baskets, purses and hats. Wood carving is a highly developed art form, with distinct regional styles evident in the decoration of balcony railings and other architectural elements. Sculptors create a variety of furniture and household goods, aloalo funerary posts, and wooden sculptures, many of which are produced for the tourist market. The decorative and functional woodworking traditions of the Zafimaniry people of the central highlands was inscribed on UNESCO's list of Intangible Cultural Heritage in 2008.

Among the Antaimoro people, the production of paper embedded with flowers and other decorative natural materials is a long-established tradition that the community has begun to market to eco-tourists. Embroidery and drawn thread work are done by hand to produce clothing, as well as tablecloths and other home textiles for sale in local crafts markets. A small but growing number of fine art galleries in Antananarivo, and several other urban areas, offer paintings by local artists, and annual art events, such as the Hosotra open-air exhibition in the capital, contribute to the continuing development of fine arts in Madagascar.

=== Performing arts ===
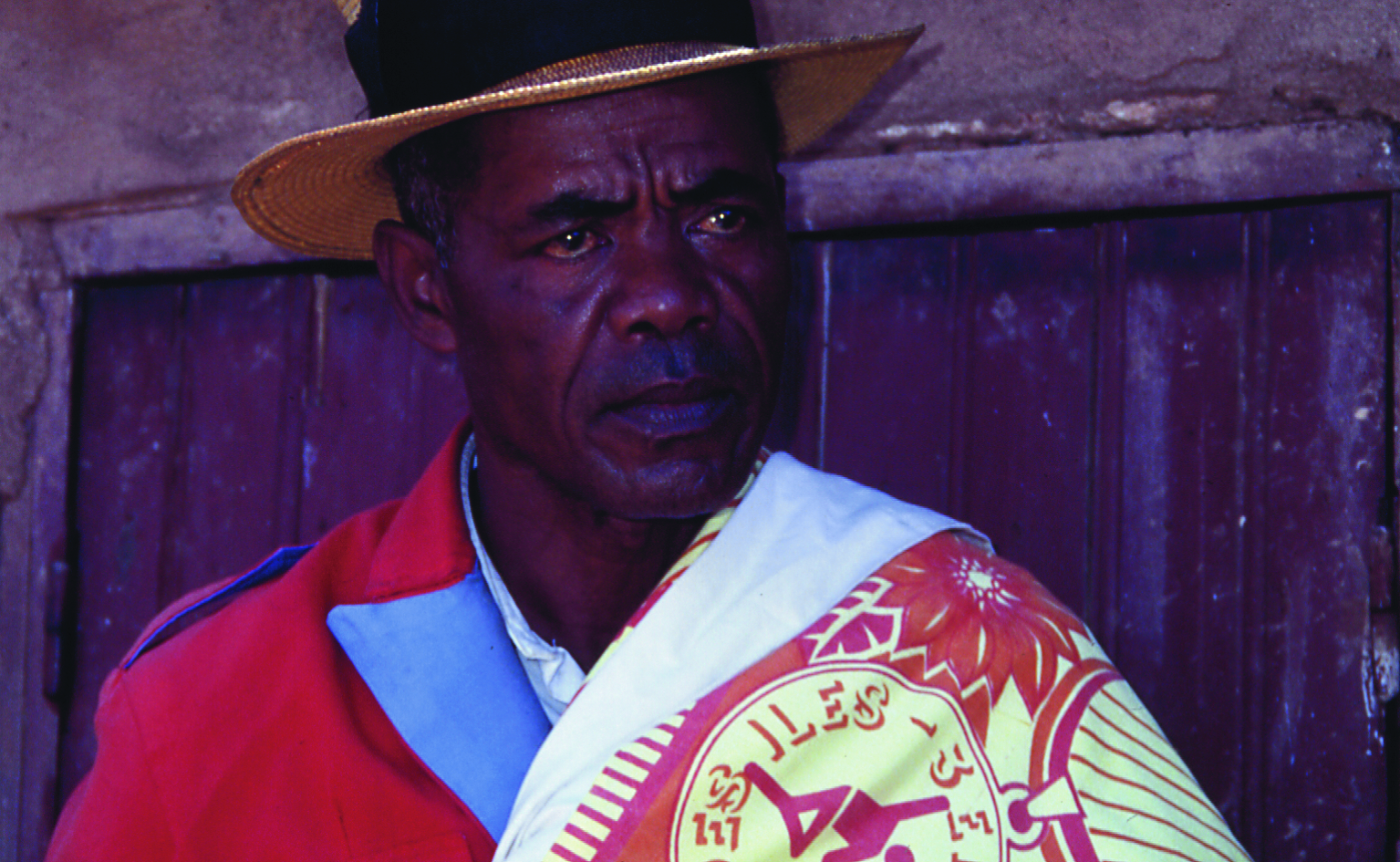
Ramilison Besigara, leader of the Malagasy hiragasy troupe Tarika Ramilison Fenoarivo

Theater and dance are strong traditions on the island. A traditional form of theater emerged in the form of the hiragasy, a day-long spectacle of music, song, dance and oration performed by a troupe (typically related by blood or marriage and of rural origin) or as a competition between two troupes. The tradition in its contemporary form began in the late 18th century when Merina prince Andrianampoinimerina first used musicians to draw a crowd for his political speeches. These troupes became independent and began to incorporate political commentary and critique in their performances. The audience plays an active role at hiragasy events, expressing their satisfaction with the talent of the troupe members and the message they proclaim either through applause, cheers or sounds of disapproval. The troupe Tarika Ramilison Fenoarivo led by Ramilison Besigara is considered the most popular and influential hiragasy troupe of the last four decades. Western theater was introduced with French colonization in 1896, producing a new form of Malagasy theater that incorporated a series of short musical and dance performances set to songs accompanied by piano or guitar played in the style of traditional valiha culture songs. The compositions of this period by pianist theatrical composers like Andrianary Ratianarivo (1895–1949) and Naka Rabemananatsoa (1892–1952) form part of the canon of classical Malagasy music and feature in the repertoire of Malagasy students of piano.

The dances accompanying theatrical performances represent only a fraction of the myriad diverse dance styles found across the island. Dance remains a living art and new styles are continually emerging. Many have lent their name to the style of music to which they are danced. In the 19th century royal court, the quadrille was danced to Malagasy-influenced piano tunes; the last of these Malagasy quadrilles, called the Afindrafindrao, was composed shortly before colonization and accompanies a specific partner dance. The tune and the dance were revived upon national independence as a distinctly Malagasy tradition now commonly performed to commence festivities such as weddings and concerts.

A wide range of performance traditions have developed in Madagascar. One of the island's foremost artistic traditions is its oratory, as expressed in the forms of hainteny (poetry), kabary (public discourse) and ohabolana (proverbs). An epic poem exemplifying these traditions, the Ibonia, has been handed down over the centuries in several different forms across the island, and offers insight into the diverse mythologies and beliefs of traditional Malagasy communities.

Elements of oral history and traditional oratory were documented by British and French visitors to the island. The first Malagasy historian was Raombana (1809–1855), one of the first pupils of the London Missionary Society school at the Rova of Antananarivo, who documented early 19th century Merina history in English and Malagasy. The Tantara ny Andriana eto Madagasikara, a compilation of the oral history of the Merina sovereigns, forms another major source of knowledge about traditional highland society and was collected and published in the late 19th century by a Catholic priest residing in the highlands. Western literary arts developed in the early 20th century under French colonization.

=== Literary arts ===
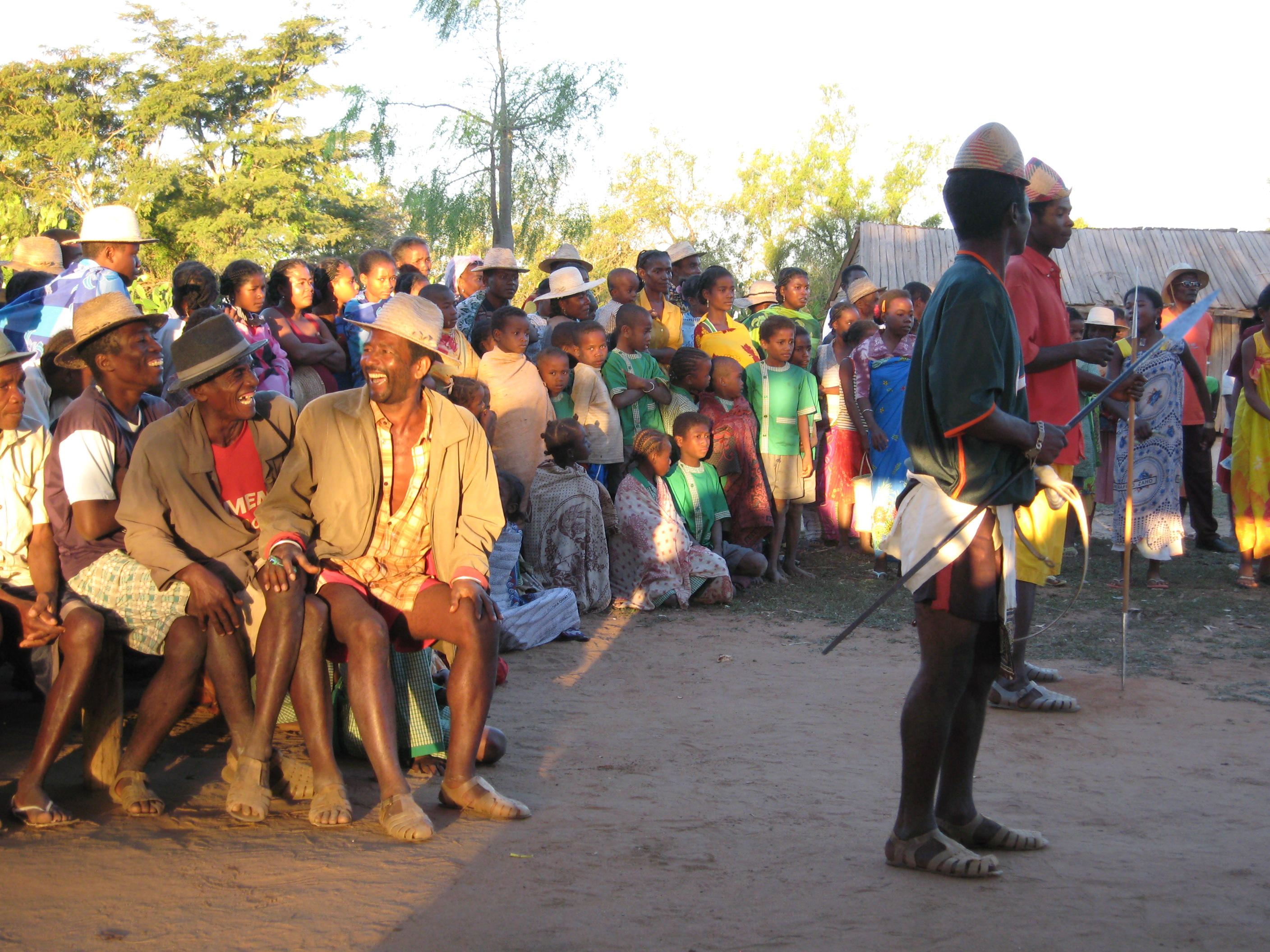
Antandroy dancers

The first African modern poet, a Merina named Jean-Joseph Rabearivelo (1901 or 1903–1937), gained celebrity for blending surrealist, romantic and modernist poetic forms with elements of traditional Malagasy oratory, as well as for his suicide by cyanide in 1937. Rabearivelo was also among the first in Madagascar to publish historical novels and wrote Madagascar's only Western-style opera. This blending of Western and traditional influence in the literary arts was carried on by such artists as Elie Rajaonarison, an exemplar of the new wave of Malagasy poetry. Other notable poets include Jacques Rabemananjara, Pierre Randrianarisoa, Georges Andriamanantena (Rado), Jean Verdi Salomon Razakandraina (Dox) and others. Leading authors include Jean-Luc Raharimanana, Michèle Rakotoson, Clarisse Ratsifandrihamanana, David Jaomanoro, Solofo Randrianja, Emilson Daniel Andriamalala and Celestin Andriamanantena. A number of comic books have also been created by Malagasy authors such as Anselme Razafindrainibe (1956–2011).

== Music ==
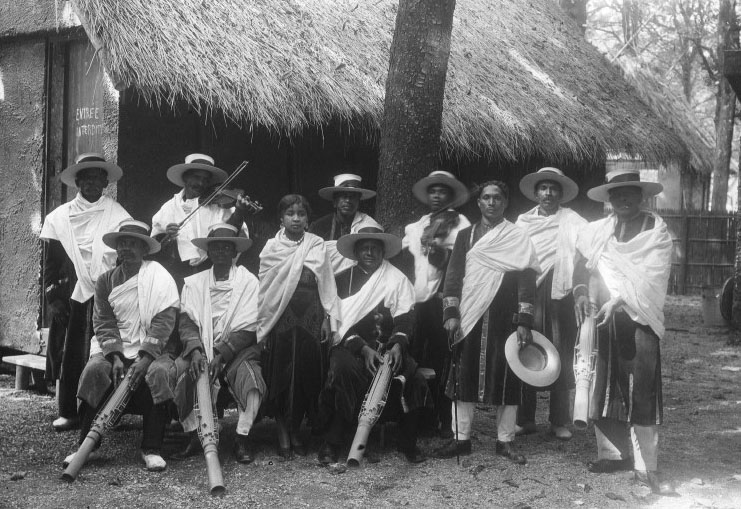
Valiha orchestra at the Paris World Exposition of 1931

Madagascar has also developed a rich musical heritage, embodied in dozens of regional musical genres such as the coastal salegy or highland hiragasy that enliven village gatherings, local dance floors and national airwaves. Malagasy music has been shaped by the musical traditions of Southeast Asia, Africa, Oceania, Arabia, England, France and the United States as successive waves of settlers have made the island their home. Traditional instruments reflect these widespread origins: the mandoliny and kabosy owe their existence to the introduction of the guitar by early Arab or European seafarers, the ubiquitous djembe originated in mainland Africa and the valiha—the bamboo tube zither considered the national instrument of Madagascar—directly evolved from an earlier form of zither carried with the first Austronesian settlers on their outrigger canoes.

Malagasy music can be roughly divided into three categories: traditional, contemporary and popular music. Traditional musical styles vary by region and reflect local ethnographic history. For instance, in the Highlands, the valiha and more subdued vocal styles are emblematic of the Merina, the predominantly Austronesian ethnic group that has inhabited the area since at least the 15th century, whereas among the southern Bara people, who trace their ancestry back to the African mainland, their a cappella vocal traditions bear close resemblance to the polyharmonic singing style common to South Africa. Foreign instruments such as the acoustic guitar and piano have been adapted locally to create uniquely Malagasy forms of music. Contemporary Malagasy musical styles such as the salegy or tsapika have evolved from traditional styles modernized by the incorporation of electric guitar, bass, drums and synthesizer. Many Western styles of popular music, including rock, gospel, jazz, reggae, hip-hop and folk rock, have also gained in popularity in Madagascar over the later half of the 20th century.

== Cuisine and food ==
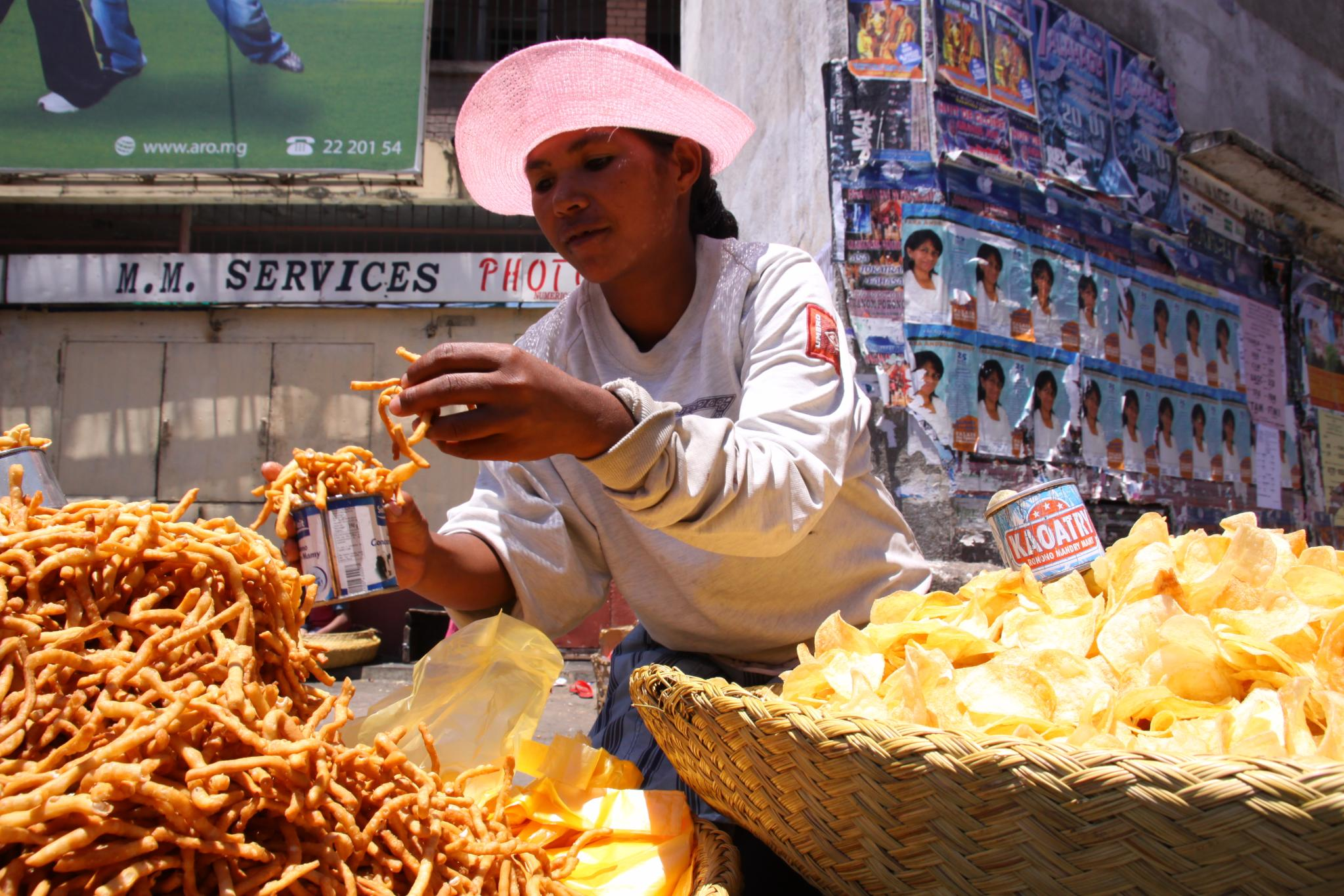
A street vendor selling fresh potato chips and traditional kaka pizon snacks

Rice (vary) is the cornerstone of the Malagasy diet and is typically consumed at every meal. The accompaniment served with rice is called laoka in the highlands dialect, the official version of the Malagasy language. Laoka are most often served in some kind of sauce: in the highlands, this sauce is generally tomato-based, while in coastal areas coconut milk is often added during cooking. In the arid southern and western interior where herding zebu is traditional, fresh or curdled zebu milk is often incorporated into vegetable dishes. Laoka are diverse and may include such ingredients as Bambara groundnuts with pork, beef or fish; trondro gasy (freshwater fish); ravitoto (shredded cassava leaves) with peanuts, beef or pork; henan'omby (beef) or akoho (chicken) sauteed with ginger and garlic or simmered in its own juices (a preparation called ritra); various types of seafood, which are more readily available along the coasts or in large urban centers. A variety of local greens such as anamamy (Morelle greens), anamafaitra (Martin greens) and particularly anamalao (paracress)—distinguished by the mildly analgesic effect the boiled leaves and flowers produce—are commonly sold alongside anandrano (watercress) and anatsonga (bok choy). In the arid south and west, such as among the Bara or Tandroy peoples, staples include sweet potato, yams, taro root and especially cassava, millet and maize, generally boiled in water and occasionally served in whole milk or flavored with crushed peanuts. Ro (broth) may be served as the main laoka or in addition to it to flavor and moisten the rice.

Garlic, onions, ginger, tomatoes, mild curry, and salt are the most common ingredients used to flavor dishes, and in coastal areas other ingredients such as coconut milk, vanilla, cloves or turmeric may also be used. A variety of condiments are served on the side and mixed into the rice or laoka according to each individual's taste rather than mixing them in as the food is being cooked. The most common and basic condiment, sakay, is a spicy condiment made from red or green chili pepper. Indian-style condiments made of pickled mango, lemon, and other fruits (known as achards or lasary), are a coastal specialty; in the highlands, lasary often refers to a salad of green beans, cabbage, carrots and onion in a vinaigrette sauce, popular as a side dish or as the filling of a baguette sandwich.

== Architecture ==
The architecture of Madagascar is unique in Africa, bearing strong resemblance to the architecture of southern Borneo from which the earliest inhabitants of Madagascar are believed to have emigrated. Traditional construction in this part of Borneo, also known as South Kalimantan, is distinguished by rectangular houses raised on piles. The roof, which is supported by a central pillar, is steeply sloped; the gable beams cross to form roof horns that may be decoratively carved. The central Highlands of Madagascar are populated by the Merina, peoples who bear strong physiological and cultural resemblance to their Kalimantan ancestors; here, the traditional wooden houses of the aristocracy feature a central pillar (andry) supporting a steeply sloped roof decorated with roof horns (tandro-trano). In the southeast of Madagascar, actual zebu horns were traditionally affixed to the gable peak. Throughout Madagascar, houses are rectangular with a gabled roof as in Kalimantan, central pillars are widespread, and in all but a handful of regions, traditional homes are built on piles in a manner handed down from generation to generation, regardless of whether the feature is suited to local conditions.

Certain cosmological and symbolic elements are common across Indonesian and Malagasy architecture as well. The central house pillar is sacred in Kalimantan and Madagascar alike, and in both places, upon constructing a new house this pillar was often traditionally anointed with blood. The features of the building or its dimensions (length, size, and particularly the height) are often symbolically indicative of the status of its occupants or the importance of its purpose on both islands. Likewise, both Madagascar and Borneo have a tradition of partially above-ground tomb construction and the inhabitants of both islands practice the carving of decorative wooden funerary posts, called aloalo in western Madagascar and klirieng in the Kajang dialect of Borneo.

== Recreation and sports ==
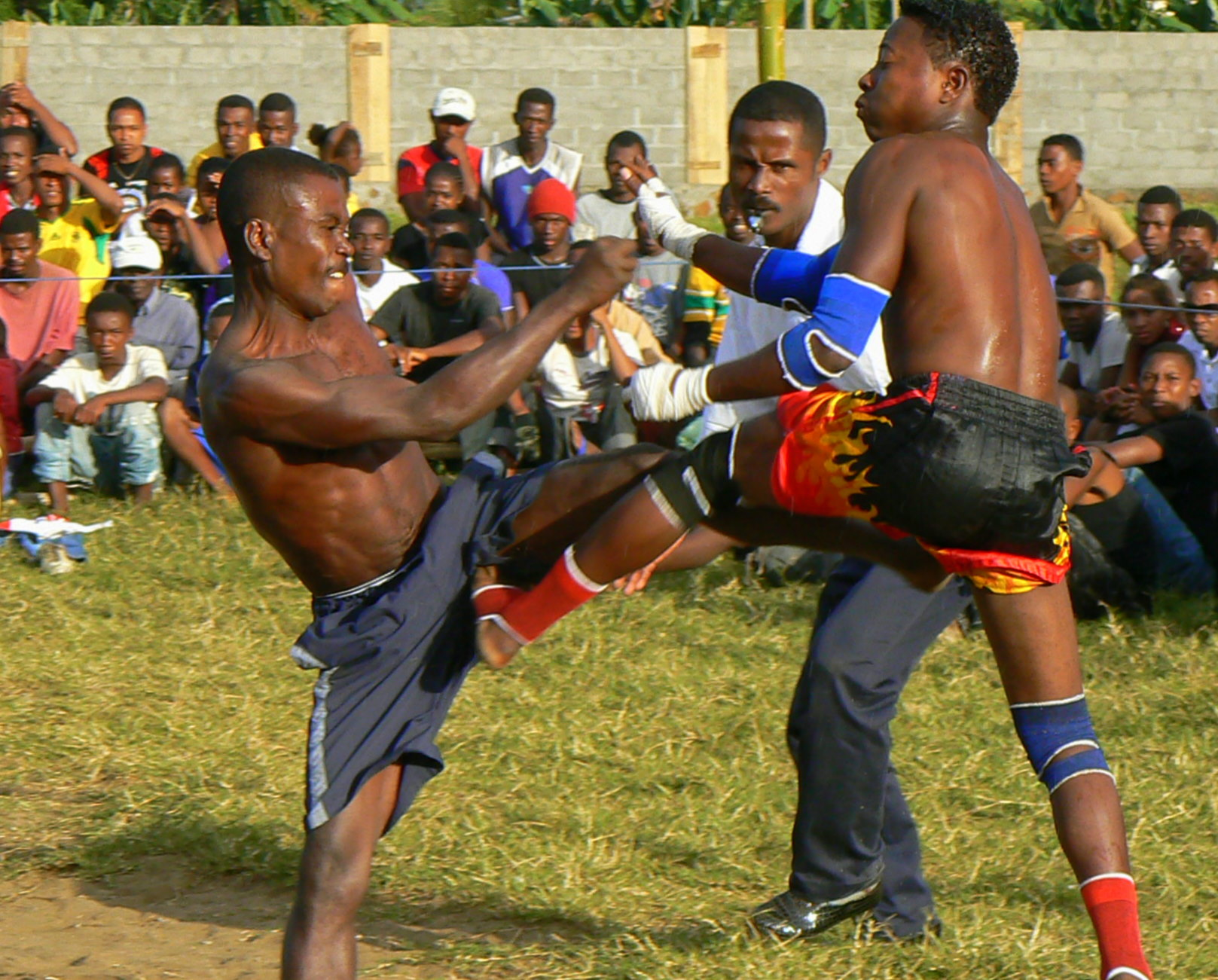
Moraingy is a traditional martial art of Madagascar.

A number of traditional pastimes have emerged in Madagascar. Moraingy, a type of hand-to-hand combat, is a popular spectator sport in coastal regions. It is traditionally practiced by men, but women have recently begun to participate. The wrestling of zebu cattle (tolon'omby) is also practiced in many regions. In addition to sports, a wide variety of games are played. Among the most emblematic is fanorona, a board game widespread throughout the Highland regions. According to folk legend, the succession of King Andrianjaka after his father Ralambo was partially due to the obsession that Andrianjaka's older brother may have had with playing fanorona to the detriment of his other responsibilities.

Western recreational activities were introduced to Madagascar over the past two centuries. Rugby is considered the national sport of Madagascar. Football (soccer) is also popular. Madagascar has produced a world champion in pétanque, a French game similar to lawn bowling, which is widely played in urban areas and throughout the Highlands. School athletics programs typically include soccer, track and field, judo, boxing, women's basketball and women's tennis. Madagascar sent its first competitors to the Olympic Games in 1964 and has also competed in the African Games. Scouting is represented in Madagascar by its own local federation of three scouting clubs. Membership in 2011 was estimated at 14,905.

== Popular media ==
=== Cinema ===
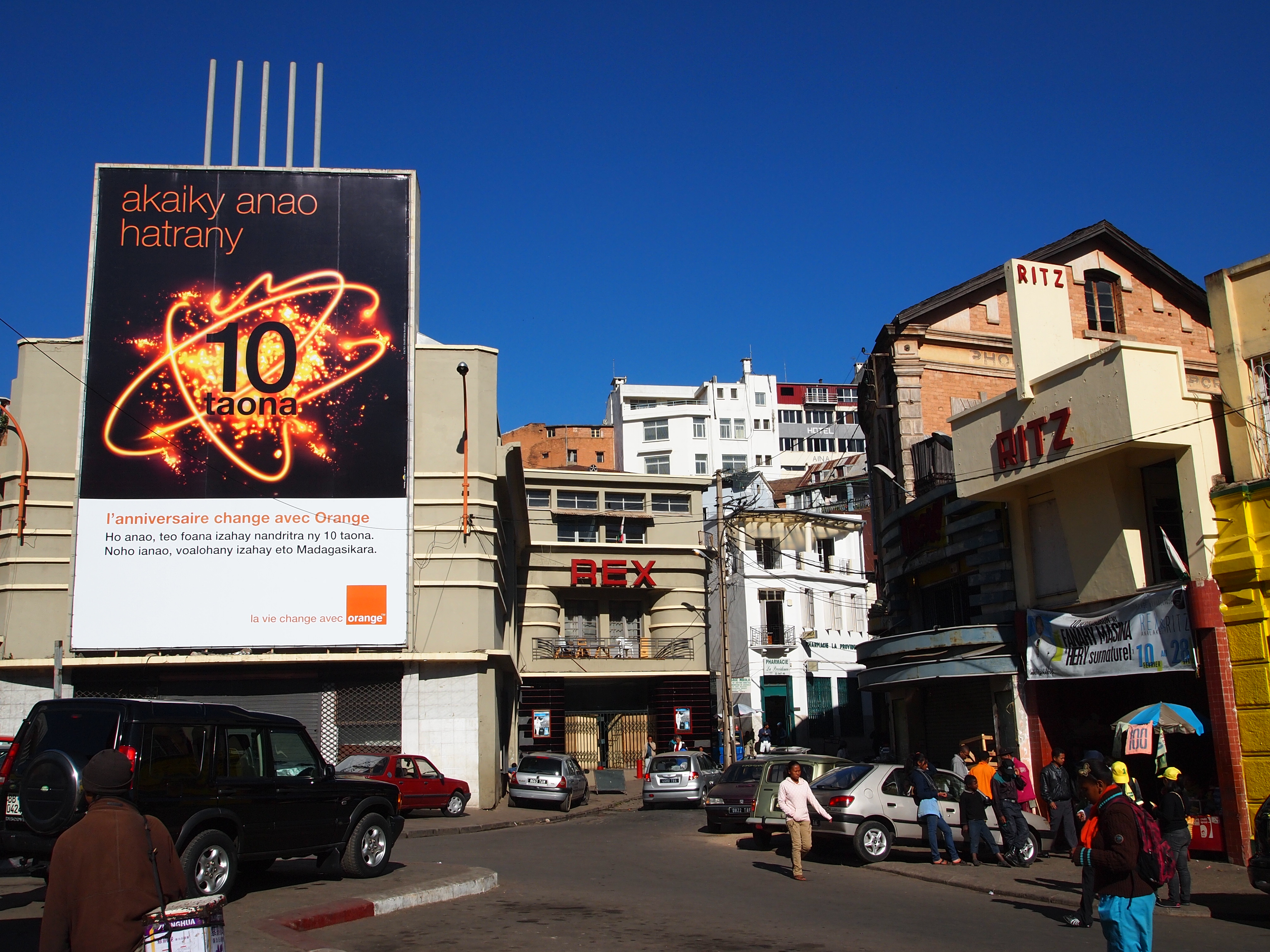
Rex and Riz cinemas in Antananarivo, Madagascar.

In 1975, the Malagasy government nationalized the movie theatres and established the Office du Cinema Malgache. The national film industry, although very much in its infancy, is influenced by Nollywood (Nigerian cinema) and French cinema. The most notable director is Raymond Rajaonarivelo, director of movies such as Quand Les Etoiles Rencontrent La Mer (When the Stars Meet the Sea) and Tabataba (The Spreading of Rumors). The Zebu d'or (Golden Zebu) of the annual film festival Rencontres du Film Court Madagascar is an award given to honor the best films and artists in the industry.

There are two cinemas in Antananarivo and one in Mahajanga, all dating from the colonial era, but none show standard international releases or operate on a regular schedule. These venues instead occasionally screen Malagasy films or are used for private events and religious services. Hollywood blockbuster films and some international films, particularly including martial arts, horror and action releases, are typically broadcast on television and purchased as bootleg DVDs or digital media files in major urban areas. Bruce Lee has historically been very popular in Madagascar. In smaller towns, films are often shown at improvised movie houses typically consisting of benches in a room fitted with a television and video player. Most films are dubbed into French.
