= Ny Avana Ramanantoanina =

Malagasy author, playwright, and poet (1891–1940)

- Born: 1891; Ambatofotsy, Madagascar
- Died: 1940 (aged 48–49); Antananarivo, Madagascar
- Occupations: Poet, writer

Ny Avana Ramanantoanina (1891–1940) was a Malagasy poet and playwright. He is among the most celebrated literary artists of Madagascar, principally renowned for his poetry, but also his stories and plays. He wrote during the colonial period and is considered to have been the first Malagasy writer to weave political messages into his work. He wrote primarily in the Malagasy language. A contemporary of Jean-Joseph Rabearivelo, who is commonly cited as the first African poet to write according to Western conventions, Ramanantoanina was highly critical of the French colonial authority. He was a member of the secret nationalist organization Vy Vato Sakelika, and was exiled to Mayotte in the Comoros when the organization was banned by the French colonial authority in 1917. His writings were consequently banned and were not reprinted until the 1980s in Madagascar. As a result, his writings are relatively less well known in international literary circles than those of Rabearivelo.

Ramanantoanina was born in 1891 in Ambatofotsy, a suburb of Antananarivo in central Madagascar, to a family that belonged to the former Merina aristocracy that had been dissolved upon French colonization in 1896. After completing his education in a private Protestant school, Ramanantoanina began writing and publishing his work in several local literary journals at the age of 16 under the pen name Ny Avana (rainbow). He gained popularity with his early publication Chant de fiancailles (Wedding Engagement Song) in 1907.

Ramanantoanina was among the first generation of Malagasy poets to attempt to develop a structure and theory of Malagasy language poetry, who would be termed Ny Mpanoratra zokiny (The Elders) by later generations of Malagasy literary artists. His work drew upon the traditional Malagasy poetic form of hainteny, integrating standard characteristics of the form such as embona (nostalgia) and hanina (longing) into his poems as a means to promote the unity of the Malagasy people and encourage a return to traditional values.

After returning from exile in Comoros in 1922, he was excluded from opportunities for a lucrative career with the colonial government, and instead earned a modest living as a clerk in a book shop in the capital city. His works during this period became increasingly characterized by themes of disillusionment. He founded a literary movement called Mitady ny Very (Search for Lost Values), and on 5 August 1931 he launched a literary journal called Fandrosoam-baovao (New Progress) with fellow writers Jean-Joseph Rabearivelo and Charles Rajoelisolo. He died in 1940 in Antananarivo.

After national independence in 1960, his writings were promoted nationally as evidence of the nationalist sentiment of the Malagasy elite in Antananarivo during colonization. There is a street named after him in Antananarivo.

== Works ==
Complete anthologies:

- Oeuvres complètes, tome I. Le diariste (Les Calepins bleus), l'épistolier, le moraliste. Edited by Serge Meitinger, Liliane Ramarosoa and Claire Riffard. Paris: Éditions du CNRS, 2010.

Poetry:

- La Coupe de cendres. Antananarivo: G. Pitot de la Beaujardière, 1924.

Theatrical plays:

- Imaitsoanala, fille d'oiseau: cantate. Antananarivo: Imprimerie officielle, 1935.

Prose:

- L'Interférence, suivi de Un conte de la nuit. Paris: Hatier, 1988.

Miscellaneous:

- Ephémérides de Madagascar. Edited by M. Eugene Jaeglé. Antananarivo: 1934.

== See also ==
- Jean-Joseph Rabearivelo
- Jacques Rabemananjara
- Dox Razakandrainy
- Elie Rajaonarison
- Aimé Césaire
- Léon Damas
- Harlem Renaissance
