= Elie Rajaonarison =

Malagasy writer (1951–2010)

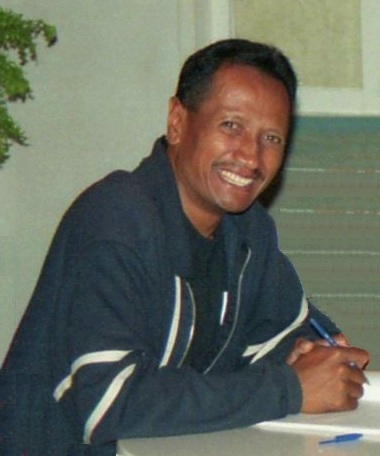
- Rajaonarison in 1999
- Born: November 15, 1951; Ambatondrazaka, Madagascar
- Died: November 27, 2010 (aged 59); Antananarivo, Madagascar
- Resting place: Ambohitrakely Avaratra, Ambohidrano Atsinanana
- Occupations: Poet, writer, professor of cultural anthropology
- Spouse: Mamisoa Ramananarivo

Elie Rajaonarison (November 15, 1951 – November 27, 2010) was a poet, artist, professor and civil servant from Madagascar. Considered the standard-bearer for modern Malagasy poetry, Rajaonarison's published poetry anthologies earned him international recognition and have been translated into French and English.

== Biography ==
Elie Rajaonarison was born on November 15, 1951, in Ambatondrazaka, a town in the central highlands of Madagascar. His marriage to Mamisoa Ramananarivo as a young man produced three daughters.

A prolific poet and advocate for Malagasy traditional culture and the arts, Rajaonarison founded the Malagasy poetry association Faribolana Sandratra to advance the development of poetry among Madagascar's youth. He was credited with inspiring a new generation of Malagasy poets and artists through his advocacy and highly attended public performances of his works, which were regularly held at the Centre Germano-Malgache (CGM) in Antananarivo. Provocative folk-fusion singer Samoëla referenced Elie Rajaonarison in a song entitled "Soly" on his first album, Mampirevy (1997), advising those with troubled hearts to find solace in his poetry ("Omeko anao ny tononkalon'i Elie Rajaonarison..."). Rajaonarison has also translated several poems by Jacques Prevert from French into Malagasy.

Rajaonarison was an active advocate for preserving and advancing Madagascar's wide range of performing arts. He developed a theatrical piece in partnership with the Centre Culturel Francais called Tana-Cergy, which was performed by a troupe of Malagasy and French actors and toured widely in France to positive reviews. In the interest of exposing Malagasy people to the wider world of theater, Rajaonarison successfully undertook the translation of Bernard-Marie Koltès' works from French into Malagasy. His photography, a second passion, earned him accolades in artistic circles. He wrote and directed several films, and worked with other concerned artists to found the Malagasy National Committee of ICOMOS (International Council on Monuments and Sites) to advocate for the protection of Madagascar's tangible cultural and historic heritage.

Rajaonarison served as Secretary General to the Minister of Culture in the 1990s under President Albert Zafy, and was formerly a member of the AVI political party of Norbert Ratsirahonana. A faculty member of the University of Madagascar at Ankatso, Antananarivo, for over 25 years, Rajaonarison was promoted mid-career to head the Department of Sociology. His classes and research explored Malagasy culture, history, arts and world view. He was noted for his strong convictions, love of Madagascar and warm personality.

On November 27, 2010, Rajaonarison died of food poisoning at the age of 57. He received state honors and his death was widely mourned in Madagascar.

== See also ==
- Ny Avana Ramanantoanina
- Jean-Joseph Rabearivelo
- Dox Razakandrainy
- Jacques Rabemananjara
