= Jean-Joseph Rabearivelo =

Malagasy writer (1901/1903 – 1937)

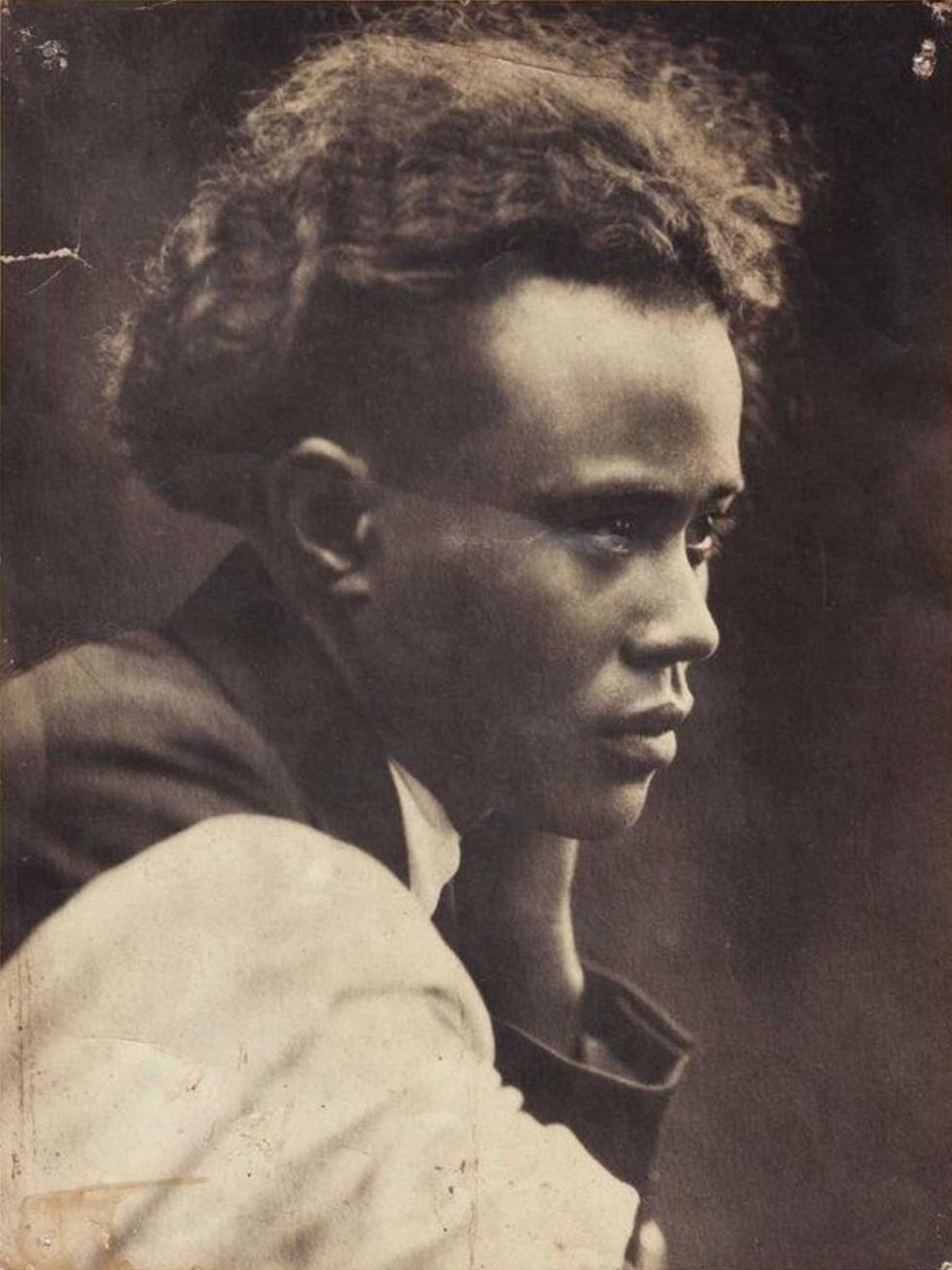
- Rabearivelo, c. 1930
- Born: Joseph-Casimir Rabearivelo; 4 March 1901 or 1903; Ambatofotsy, then part of French Madagascar
- Died: 22 June 1937 (aged 34 or 36); Antananarivo, Madagascar
- Occupation: Poet
- Spouse: Mary Razafitrimo (m. 1926)
- Children: 5
- Writing career
- Literary movement: Romantic, post-symbolist, modernist, surrealist

Jean-Joseph Rabearivelo (born Joseph-Casimir Rabearivelo; 4 March 1901 or 1903 – 22 June 1937) was a Malagasy poet who is widely considered to be Africa's first modern poet and the greatest literary artist of Madagascar. Part of the first Malagasy generation raised under French colonization, Rabearivelo grew up impoverished and failed to complete secondary education. His passion for French literature and traditional Malagasy oral poetry (hainteny) prompted him to read extensively and educate himself on a variety of subjects, including the French language and its poetic and prose traditions. He published his first poems as an adolescent in local literary reviews, soon obtaining employment at a publishing house where he worked as a proofreader and editor of its literary journals. He published numerous poetry anthologies in French and Malagasy as well as literary critiques, an opera, and two novels.

Rabearivelo's early period of modernist-inspired poetry showed skill and attracted critical attention, but adhered strictly to traditional genre conventions. The surrealist poetry he composed beginning in 1931 displayed greater originality, garnering him strong praise and acclaim. Despite increasing critical attention in international poetry reviews, Rabearivelo was never afforded access to the elite social circles of colonial Madagascar. He suffered a series of personal and professional disappointments, including the death of his daughter, the French authorities' decision to exclude him from the list of exhibitors at the Universal Exposition in Paris, and growing personal debt worsened by his opium addiction and philandering. Following Rabearivelo's suicide by cyanide poisoning in 1937, he became viewed as a colonial martyr.

The death of Rabearivelo occurred just prior to the emergence of the Négritude movement, by which time the poet had established an international reputation among literary figures such as Léopold Sédar Senghor as Africa's first modern poet. The Government of Madagascar named Rabearivelo the national poet upon the establishment of national independence in 1960. His works are a focus of ongoing academic study. Modern Malagasy poets and literary figures including Elie Rajaonarison have cited him as a major inspiration. A street and a high school in Antananarivo have been named after him, and Rabearivelo has a dedicated room in the National Library of Madagascar.

== Biography ==
=== Childhood ===
Jean-Joseph Rabearivelo, born Joseph-Casimir on 4 March 1901 or 1903 in Ambatofotsy (north of Antananarivo), Madagascar, was the only child of an unwed mother descended from the Zanadralambo ("sons of Ralambo") caste of the Merina andriana (nobles). When the French colonized Madagascar in 1897, Merina nobles including Rabearivelo's mother lost the privileges, prestige, and wealth to which they had been entitled under the former monarchy, the Kingdom of Imerina. Madagascar had been a French colony for less than a decade when Rabearivelo was born, situating him among the first generation of Malagasy to grow up under the colonial system. He first studied at the Frères des Écoles Chrétiennes school in the affluent neighborhood of Andohalo, then transferred to the prestigious Collège Saint-Michel, where he was expelled for lack of discipline, poor academic performance, and his reluctance to become religiously observant. He ended his studies at École Flacourt in 1915. He is believed to have published his first poems at age 14 in the literary review Vakio Ity under the pen name K. Verbal.

After leaving school, he worked a variety of low-skilled jobs, including as a lace designer, an errand boy, and a secretary and interpreter to a district administrator. During this period he developed a passion for French 19th and 20th century literature and refined his fluency in the French language; he also began teaching himself English, Spanish, and Hebrew. He changed his name to Jean-Joseph Rabearivelo to have the same initials as Jean-Jacques Rousseau, while continuing to occasionally use pseudonyms, including "Amance Valmond" and "Jean Osmé". He was particularly attracted to poets and writers who were outcasts in their own society, including Baudelaire and Rimbaud.

=== Early period ===
In 1920, Rabearivelo was hired as an assistant librarian at the Cercle de l'Union social club. That same year he drafted his first book, a short novel written in the Malagasy language. He began to correspond with a wide range of writers around the world, including André Gide, Paul Valéry, Jean Amrouche, Paul Claudel, and Valery Larbaud, and spent large sums to buy books and ship them to Madagascar. By these means he amassed a diverse collection that constituted the richest library on the island. In 1924 he took a job as a proofreader at the publishing house Imprimerie de l'Imerina, a position he would continue to occupy for the rest of his life. In 1921 he befriended high-level French colonial bureaucrats who shared his passion for French literature, including Robert Boudry, the colony's financial manager, and Pierre Camo, Madagascar's postal magistrate and founder of the literary magazine 18° Latitude Sud.

He published his first collection of poems, La coupe de cendres ("The Cup of Ashes") in 1924; the same year he also translated twelve previously unpublished Malagasy language poems into French and published them in literary magazines, including 18° Latitude Sud in Antananarivo and La Vie in Paris. This publication launched him into the intellectual and cultural circles of Antananarivo high society, where he established himself as Madagascar's leader not only in poetry and prose, but as an esteemed journalist, art critic, translator, and writer of essays and plays.

In 1925, he wrote a historical novel called L'Aube rouge ("The Red Dawn") about the last years of the Kingdom of Imerina and the beginning of the Franco-Hova wars. The novel specifically pays tribute to Rainandriamampandry, the governor of Toamasina who was executed by the French in 1896 for his suspected role in the Menalamba rebellion. Rabearivelo published his second and third poetry anthologies, Sylves ("Woodlands") and Volumes, in 1927 and 1928 respectively. He also published his second historical novel in 1928, L'interférence ("Interference"), which depicts the life of a noble family from the last years of the Imerina monarchy before French colonization. Throughout the 1920s, he translated the works of foreign poets and writers into Malagasy, including Baudelaire, Rimbaud, Laforgue, Rilke, Whitman, and Góngora; he also translated traditional Malagasy kabary (oratory) into French for publication in French-language literary reviews.

In 1926, Rabearivelo married Mary Razafitrimo, the daughter of a local photographer, with whom he would have five children.

=== Late period ===
In 1931, Rabearivelo's lover, the Malagasy writer Esther Razanadrasoa, died after taking abortive substances to terminate a pregnancy by the poet. After her death, Rabearivelo published an obituary telling of their close relationship, and dedicated three poems to her. Throughout the 1930s, Rabearivelo joined with other Malagasy poets and writers in an emerging literary movement termed "Hitady ny Very" ("The Search for Lost Values"), which sought to promote the traditional literary and oral arts of Madagascar. Together with fellow artists Charles Rajoelisolo and Ny Avana Ramanantoanina, in August 1931 he founded a literary journal called Ny Fandrosoam-baovao ("New Progress") to promote Malagasy-language poetry. He published two more anthologies of thirty poems each: Presque-Songes ("Dream Images") (1931) and Traduit de la nuit ("Translated from the Night") (1932). As an experiment, he wrote Malagasy and French versions of each poem in these two books; the French versions were published in 1934 and 1935 respectively. For the remainder of his life he focused primarily on the translation of hainteny (traditional Malagasy poetry) into French, work which was published posthumously. He also wrote Madagascar's first and only opera, Imaitsoanala (1935), named for the legendary heroine mother of King Ralambo; it was set to music composed by Andrianary Ratianarivo and was performed by Ratianarivo's Troupe Jeanette at the Municipal Theater of Isotry in Antananarivo.

In 1933, his three-year-old daughter Voahangy became ill and died. Rabearivelo was deeply affected by this loss and was plunged into grief from which he never recovered. His last daughter, who was born in 1936, he named Velomboahangy ("Voahangy Alive"). The theme of death became prominent and recurrent in his works and journal.

The colonial high society of Antananarivo showcased Rabearivelo's work as evidence of the success of the French assimilation policy and the beneficial effects of colonialism in Africa. In his journals, the poet wrote that he felt "used" by the French authorities in Madagascar. Governor Montagné awarded him an affiliation (membre correspondant) with the Académie Malgache in 1932. However, in 1937, Rabearivelo's trust in the assimilation messages and gestures of Antananarivo's colonial high society was betrayed. He was imprisoned for three days for failing to pay taxes, a penalty from which he should have been exempted due to his status as a low-ranking employee of the colonial administration. He had also been promised that he would represent Madagascar at the 1937 Universal Exposition in Paris, but in May, the colonial authorities informed him that he would not be part of the island's delegation. Consequently, Rabearivelo became embittered toward France and its colonial message of assimilation, a sentiment strongly expressed in his journals. He was likewise rejected by Malagasy high society, who condemned his unconventional behavior and views, particularly in light of his role as husband and father. His compatriots also held him in contempt for his perceived eagerness to embrace the French colonial rule and culture.

Rabearivelo was deeply troubled by these disappointments and his worsening chronic financial troubles, in addition to the continuing grief he felt for the death of his daughter. On 19 June 1937, a French friend informed him that his ambition to hold a higher official role within the administrative authority could never materialize as he was largely self-educated and lacked the required diplomas. Having staked his future on a government career, Rabearivelo began to muse about his own death in his journal, writing "Perhaps one needs to die to be found sincere".

=== Death ===
Rabearivelo committed suicide by cyanide poisoning on the afternoon of 22 June 1937. He may have been seriously ill with tuberculosis at the time. The morning of his suicide, Rabearivelo completed several unfinished works; he then took fourteen 250-milligram quinine capsules with water at 1:53 pm, followed at 2:37 pm by ten grams of potassium cyanide. Before dying he wrote a final poem and burned the first five volumes of his personal journal, the Calepins Bleus ("Blue Notebooks", 1924–1937), leaving four volumes of approximately 1,800 pages that document his life after 4 January 1933. In his final journal entries he recorded the detailed experience of his suicide, concluding with his final entry at 3:02 pm. At the time of his death, only half of his twenty literary works had been published; the remainder were printed posthumously. His tomb is in Fieferana.

== Style and influences ==
With remarkable originality, [Rabearivelo] synthesized Europe's prevailing urban surrealism with his own comparatively bucolic surroundings. In Rabearivelo we are offered ... the wildly innovative imagery of modern realism, permeated with the essence of traditional oral poetry. When reading Rabearivelo, unlike many other Surrealist-influenced modern poets, we never feel that we've been given a superfluous display of linguistic dexterity devoid of meaning ... Here, we know, there is something of relevance being poetically manifested by a man isolated on an island, who wishes to communicate his thoughts to the rest of the world. His poems are often deceptively simple, uniquely surreal yet logical, both sensual and abstract — yet they always bear the distinction of being infused with undeniable sincerity.

— Robert Ziller, Translated from the Night

Rabearivelo's first poetic work, La coupe de cendres (1924), demonstrates the evident mastery of meter and rhythm in his earliest works, despite an absence of innovation on the classic models of poetry he uses. The works that follow this initial effort can be broadly clustered into two phases, the first being highly influenced by the symbolist and romantic schools of poetry, and the second reflecting greater creativity and individuality in personal expression, and with a recurrent interest in reconciling a mental image of a "mythic past" with an "alienating modernity".

In the romantic period, typified by Sylves (1927) and Volumes (1928), Rabearivelo's poems are shorter and reflect a purer form of traditional models. He identified himself and his work as post-symbolist in the early part of his artistic career. Regarding Rabearivelo's works from this period, editor Jacques Rabemananjara acknowledged the poet's evident talent but critiqued his over-adherence to form and poetic conventions at the expense of innovation and genuine self-expression.

Beginning in 1931, his works begin to change in tone and show the influences of surrealism and modernism. His poems become more daring, free, and complex, while also reflecting greater doubt. According to academic Arnaud Sabatier, this change reflects "the rediscovery and embrace of the sound and images of traditional Malagasy poetry, from which he had previously distanced himself or which he had subjected to the colonial language and culture". These later works are described by academic Claire Riffard as "his strangest, evoking rural and commonplace images alongside unexpected dreamlike visions, superimposing the new and the forgotten …" His break from convention in this period offered greater freedom to reconcile his conflicted identity, such as through his bilingual creations, Presque-Songes (1931) and Traduit de la nuit (1932).

== Legacy ==
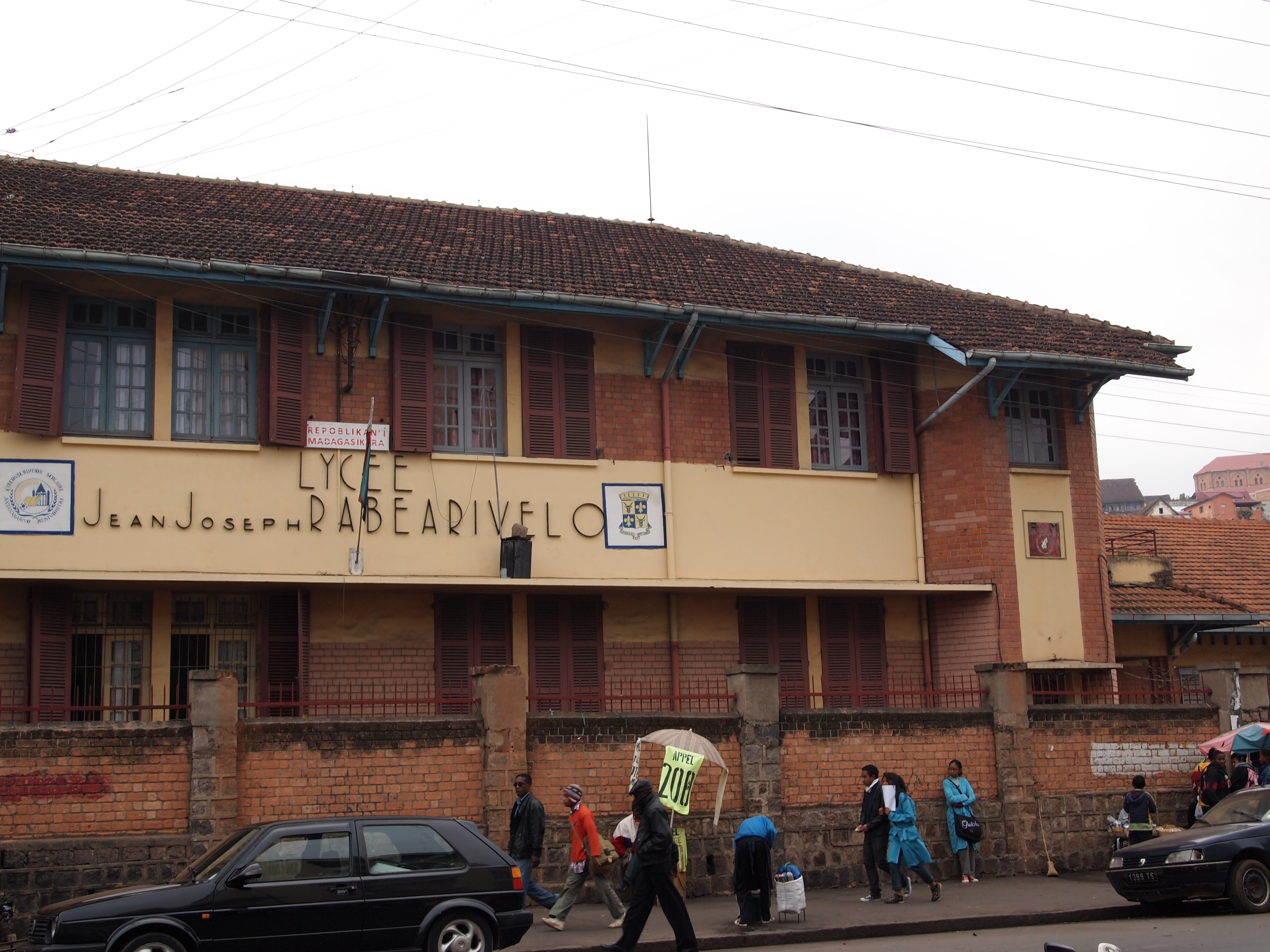
Jean-Joseph Rabearivelo high school in Antananarivo

Rabearivelo has long been considered the first modern poet of Africa. Academic Arnaud Sabatier identifies him as "one of the most important writers of the twentieth century". He has also been described by Radio France Internationale journalist Tirthankar Chanda as "the founder of the African francophonie" and "the enfant terrible of French literature". Rabearivelo is the most internationally famous and influential Malagasy literary figure. Jeune Afrique described him as "Madagascar's greatest poet", a sentiment echoed by Léopold Sédar Senghor, first president of Senegal and founder of the Négritude movement, who called him the "prince of the Malagasy poets". He was described by academic Claire Riffard as "one of the principal founders of contemporary Malagasy literature", and following national independence in 1960, the government of Madagascar affirmed his cultural contributions by promoting him as the island's national writer.

Rabearivelo struggled throughout his life to reconcile his identity as Malagasy with his aspiration toward French assimilation and connection with the greater universal human experience. He has been depicted as a martyr figure as a result of his suicide following the refusal of French authorities to grant him permission to go to France. He has been the subject of a significant number of books and conferences; on the fiftieth anniversary of his death, his work was commemorated at events organized in North America, Europe and Africa, including a week-long conference at the University of Antananarivo. Recent scholarship has questioned Rabearivelo's elevation as a colonial martyr, arguing that the poet was by and large an assimilationist who did not view himself as African.

The Lycée Jean-Joseph Rabearivelo was inaugurated in central Antananarivo on 21 December 1946 in honor of the poet. A room has been dedicated to the poet in the National Library of Madagascar, located in the capital city.

He was included in the seminal volume of poetry of the Négritude movement, Léopold Senghor's Anthologie de la nouvelle poesie negre et malgache ("Anthology of New Black and Malagasy Poetry"), published in 1948. He has inspired many Malagasy writers and poets after him, including Elie Rajaonarison, an exemplar of the new wave of Malagasy poetry.

The Francophone University Agency and Madagascar's National Center for Scientific Research collaborated to publish the entirety of Rabearivelo's works in three volumes. The first volume, comprising his journal and some of his correspondence with key figures in literary and colonial circles, was printed in October 2010. The second volume, a compilation of all his previously published works, was released in July 2012. The remaining 1,000 pages of materials produced by Rabearivelo have been published in digital format. The first complete English translation of his masterpiece Translated from the Night was published by Lascaux Editions in 2007.

== Works ==
Complete anthologies:

- Œuvres complètes, tome I. Le diariste (Les Calepins bleus), l'épistolier, le moraliste. Edited by Serge Meitinger, Liliane Ramarosoa and Claire Riffard. Paris: Éditions du CNRS, 2010.
- Œuvres complètes, tome II. Le poète, le narrateur, le dramaturge, le critique, le passeur de langues, l'historien. Edited by Serge Meitinger, Liliane Ramarosoa, Laurence Ink and Claire Riffard. Paris: Éditions du CNRS, 2012.

Poetry:

- La Coupe de cendres. Antananarivo: G. Pitot de la Beaujardière, 1924.
- Sylves. Antananarivo: Imprimerie de l'Imerina, 1927.
- Volumes. Antananarivo: Imprimerie de l'Imerina, 1928.
- Presque-songes. Antananarivo: Imprimerie de l'Imerina, 1934.
- Traduit de la nuit. Tunis: Éditions de Mirage, 1935; Paris: Éditions Orphée La Différence, 1991; Paris: Éditions Sépia / Tananarive: Tsipika, 2007.
- Chants pour Abéone. Antananarivo: Éditions Henri Vidalie, 1936.
- Lova. Antananarivo: Imprimerie Volamahitsy, 1957.
- Des Stances oubliées. Antananarivo: Imprimerie Liva, 1959.
- Poèmes (Presque-songes, Traduit de la nuit). Antananarivo: Imprimerie officielle, 1960.
- Amboara poezia sy tononkalo malagasy. Antananarivo: Éditions Madagasikara, 1965.
- Vieilles chansons des pays d'Imerina. Antananarivo: Éditions Madprint, 1967.
- Poèmes (Presque-songes, Traduit de la nuit, Chants pour Abéone). Paris: Hatier, 1990.

Theatrical plays:

- Imaitsoanala, fille d'oiseau: cantate. Antananarivo: Imprimerie officielle, 1935.
- Aux portes de la ville. Antananarivo: Imprimerie officielle, 1936.
- Imaitsoanala, zana-borona. Antananarivo: Imprimerie nationale, 1988.
- Eo ambavahadim-boahitra. Antananarivo: Imprimerie nationale, 1988.
- Resy hatrany. Antananarivo: Imprimerie nationale, 1988.

Prose:

- L'Interférence, suivi de Un conte de la nuit. Paris: Hatier, 1988.
- Irène Ralimà sy Lala roa. Antananarivo: Imprimerie nationale, 1988.
- L'Aube rouge. Paris: Bouquins, 1998.

Miscellaneous:

- Enfants d'Orphée. Mauritius: The General Printing, 1931.
- Ephémérides de Madagascar. Edited by M. Eugene Jaeglé. Antananarivo: 1934.
- Tananarive, ses quartiers et ses rues. Edited by E. Baudin. Antananarivo: Imprimerie de l'Imerina, 1936.

Audio recordings:

- "Jean-Joseph Rabearivelo". Audio archives of African and Indian Ocean literature. Radio France Internationale, in cooperation with Radio Télévision Malagasy. December 1990.

== See also ==
- Aimé Césaire
- Léon Damas
- Harlem Renaissance
- Jacques Rabemananjara
- Elie Rajaonarison
- Ny Avana Ramanantoanina
- Dox Razakandrainy
- Esther Razanadrasoa
