= Samoëla =

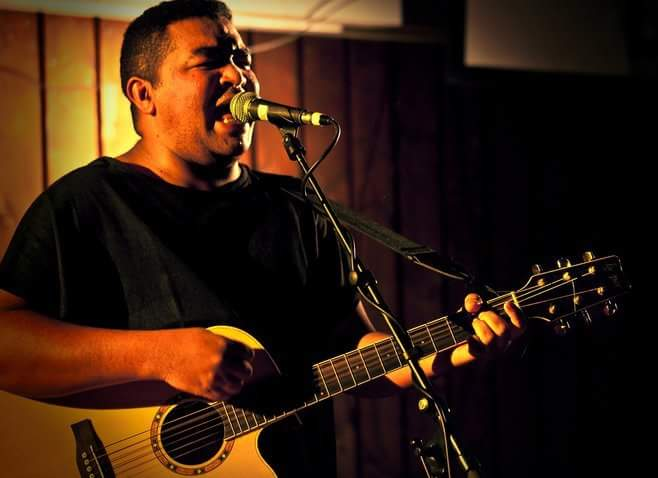

Background information
- Born: Samoëla Rasolofoniaina; 2 April 1976 (age 50); Madagascar
- Genres: Folk fusion, roots music
- Occupations: Singer, songwriter
- Instruments: Voice, guitar
- Years active: 1998–present

Samoëla Rasolofoniaina, better known as Samoëla, is a Malagasy vocalist and composer of contemporary folk fusion and roots music that draws upon musical traditions throughout the island of Madagascar. He typically sings and plays acoustic guitar, accompanied by an ensemble including bass guitar, Western and traditional percussion, and backup singers. He is distinguished by his use of hainteny traditional poetry and its metaphorical language, as well as youth slang and culturally subversive direct language to critique and address sensitive social and political topics.

== Early life ==
Samoëla Rasolofoniaina was born in Madagascar on 2 April 1976. In school he began writing poetry and particularly the traditional Malagasy poetry form called hainteny, which incorporates proverbs and figurative language to address culturally sensitive topics. At the same time, he studied theater performance for four years under Christiane Ramanantsoa, a leading Malagasy actress, author and promoter of the arts. In his late teens and early twenties he studied marketing and tourism at ISCAM, with the intent to open a musical production company for the promotion of Malagasy artists.

In 1995, a 19-year-old Samoëla attended a Vahombey concert at the Cercle Germano-Malgache that inspired him to become more directly involved in songwriting. The concert impressed upon him the opportunity to express himself musically by challenging Malagasy cultural and musical norms. In particular, he decided to disregard taboos that prevented artists from addressing controversial or delicate topics in song, instead writing slang-infused lyrics that spoke directly to youth concerns. Many of his lyrics were also imbued with such elements of hainteny as its figurative and poetic descriptions and plays on words.

== Musical career ==
Samoëla began writing compositions in 1996 and gave his first performance that year at the Alliance Francaise in Antananarivo, followed by concerts at numerous other cultural centers across the island. These performances attracted the attention of a French music magazine publisher, who invited him to contribute to an upcoming compilation album and participate in its promotional tour in France. During this same period, a journalist recorded and broadcast one of Samoëla's concerts. A producer from Studio Mars, Madagascar's most venerable recording studio, heard the performance and invited the artist to record his debut album, Mampirevy, released in 1997. His first single off the album, "Havako Mamomamo", criticized Malagasy men who are unable to express their emotions without being inebriated. Samoëla wrote the music and lyrics to the single but hired two female vocalists, Vero and Poune, to sing. His first concert promoted the new album and was performed at CC Esca in Antananarivo on 14 November 1997.

Mampirevy sold more than 35,000 copies, setting a record that remains unsurpassed in 2013 by any Malagasy artist. He was named the 1997 "Artist of the Year" in Madagascar. His second album, Manatosaka, was released in 1999. In addition to touring across Madagascar, the artist promoted the new release with concerts in Reunion, Mauritius, Seychelles, Kenya, Mozambique and Namibia. This was followed by a tour across France in 2000, including performances in Paris, Toulouse, Marseille and Lyon.

The release of his third album, Efa sy Dimy (2001), was supported by a European tour in 2002 that included Paris, Lyon, Bordeaux, Toulon, Lausanne and Munich. The release of his fourth and fifth albums, Bandy Akama (2004) and Efa sy Folo (2005), were followed in 2006 by overseas performances in Paris, Marseille and Toulouse. A sixth album, 'Ty (2007), was likewise promoted in France with performances in Paris and Toulouse. In 2010 Samoëla released a seventh album entitled Zana-bahoaka, which enjoyed high sales. This was followed in 2013 by Maha-domelina, his eighth album, which condemned the consequences of the 2009 Malagasy political crisis and the Malagasy politicians responsible.

Samoëla continues to regularly give open-air concerts around the country but also performs at cabarets in the capital city of Antananarivo where many of his urban fans prefer his more intimate performances. He performs with longtime band members Roger (guitar), Mika Kely (bass guitar), Miora (drum kit), and Tina Kely (supplemental percussion and backing vocals). As of 2013, the artist has toured in 16 countries around the world.

=== Style and image ===
A NewsMada journalist described Samoëla as the enfant terrible of Malagasy-language songwriting. He has generated acclaim and controversy over his lyrics, which condemn social ills and confront the concerns of youth using direct and unequivocal language, in opposition to predominant cultural norms favoring indirectness and avoidance of criticism or confrontation. In a 2010 interview, Samoëla declared a preference for writing about daily life and issues that others are reluctant to discuss openly. As examples he cited "Tiavina", which critiques parents who prioritize church attendance over family responsibilities, and "Kristy", which condemns evangelical churches in Madagascar for urging their impoverished devotees to donate what little money they have to the church.

Samoëla declares himself influenced by the folk music and protest song genres, but remarked that his music is typically categorized in overseas markets as "African pop". He blends elements of traditional Malagasy music such as southern vocal harmonies and 6/8 rhythms with hip-hop, rap and other contemporary genres. The folk-fusion music accompanying his lyrics typically features bass guitar, acoustic guitar (which Samoëla himself often plays), and diverse percussion instruments including djembe and shakers. His songs often also feature electric guitar and a wide range of traditional Malagasy instruments such as kabosy and valiha. Samoëla typically performs wearing custom-made traditional Malagasy clothing such as a malabary - a long cotton tunic over loose matching trousers - embroidered with Malagasy motifs like the aloalo.

The Alliance Française described Samoëla as "One of the most important figures of lyrical songwriting [in Madagascar]." A 2012 study published in the Indian Ocean Daily News found that Samoëla had the seventh most "likes" of any Malagasy artist with an official Facebook page.

== Other activities ==
In 1998, Samoëla performed in a musical play entitled Tana-Cergy written by Vincent Colin and celebrated Malagasy poet Elie Rajaonarison. In the play he performed alongside fellow musical acts Trafic de Style and The Specialist. The play toured France to wide acclaim in the French press. In 2005 he released Poezia Project, a compilation album of his original hainteny poetry.

From the beginning of his career, the artist has acted as the principal sound engineer, producer and tour manager for his eponymous group. Since 2010 the mixing of the band's music has been handled by Andry, a fellow band member. Samoëla is the founder and owner of Be Mozik! production studio, which produces music videos for many new Malagasy artists. It is one of the few studios to support the fight against bootlegging by encrypting its CDs with coding to prevent illegal copying, and the only one to exclusively sell audio CDs rather than VCDs.

== Discography ==
| Title | Released | Label | Tracks |
|---|---|---|---|
| Mampirevy | 1997 | Mars | 9 (--') |
| Manatosaka | 1999 | Mars | 11 (45') |
| Efa sy Dimy | 2001 | Mars | 19 (71') |
| Bandy Akama | 2005 | Be Mozik! | 16 (71') |
| Efa sy Folo | 2005 | Be Mozik! | 10 (45') |
| Teny an-tsehatra 2006 | 2007 | Be Mozik! | 14 (--') |
| 'Ty | 2007 | Be Mozik! | 12 (52') |
| Zana-bahoaka | 2010 | Be Mozik! | 10 (45') |
| Maha-domelina | 2013 | Be Mozik! | 10 (--') |
| ... Ao anatiny | 2015 | Be Mozik! | 10 (--') |
