= Jacques Rabemananjara =

Malagasy politician, playwright and poet (1913–2005)

Second Vice President of Madagascar
- In office February 1971 – May 1972
- President: Philibert Tsiranana

Personal details
- Born: 23 June 1913 Maroantsetra, French Madagascar
- Died: 2 April 2005 (aged 91) Paris, France
- Education: Antananarivo
- Occupation: Politician, playwright and poet
- Known for: Politics and poetry

Jacques Rabemananjara (23 June 1913 – 2 April 2005) was a Malagasy politician, playwright and poet. He served as a government minister, rising to Vice President of Madagascar. Rabemananjara was said to be the most prolific writer of his negritude generation after Senghor, and he had the first négritude poetry published.

== Early life ==
Rabemananjara was born in Maroantsetra in Antongil Bay in eastern Madagascar on 23 June 1913, of Betsimisarakan origin. He began his education on the island of Sainte Marie, but soon left to finish his studies at the seminary at Antananarivo, the capital of Madagascar.

In 1935–36, the Madagascan authorities prohibited any further publication of a monthly journal of young people of Madagascar, which he was responsible for. The magazine, Revue des Jeunes de Madagascar, had 10 issues. The journal was an early example of political writing pre-dating later more well-known examples of négritude.

== Writing ==
Despite his leadership of the journal, Rabemanajara was chosen in 1939 to attend a commemoration in Paris for the 150th anniversary of the French revolution. Having travelled to Paris he was able to not only gain entry to the Sorbonne and took courses in administration, but also to get his first collection of poetry, On the Steps of the Evening, published. In Paris, he met the Senegalese poet and politician Léopold Sédar Senghor and Alioune Diop who all participated in the important African studies journal Presence Africaine.

Influenced by the work of fellow Malagasy poet Jean-Joseph Rabearivelo, his early work dealt in classical alexandrian metre with the early history of Madagascar. His 1940 work Sur les marches du soir dealt with the forced exile of Queen Ranavalona III. She had been removed by the French colonial powers in 1897. Rabemananjara published his play Les dieux malgaches, the first modern Malagasy play in French, This play dealt with the pre-colonial past and with the coup that unseated King Radama II in 1863.

== Politics ==
After the war, Rabemananjara also met Raseta and Joseph Ravoahangy, who was a partner with Rabemananjara in the creation of the MDRM (Democratic Movement for the Renovation of Madagascar).

Rabemananjara was elected to represent the Tamatave region in 1946 as the third member of the National Assembly from Madagascar. As a journalist at this time he interviewed Ho Chi Minh including his association with the Malagasy politician Jean Ralaimongo. He was suspected of being involved in the instigation of the 1947 Malagasy Uprising, despite the fact that he had urged the rioters to be calm. He was arrested, and sentenced to life imprisonment with hard labour.

During his captivity he wrote the poems Antsa, Lamba and Antidote. Rabemanajara was eventually pardoned in 1956. Rabemananjara's freedom allowed him to attend the first International Congress of Black Writers and Artists in Paris. He was one of the main speakers and earned a place at the top table of this important conference, which was funded by UNESCO and was still celebrated 50 years later.

He was exiled in France until Madagascar's independence in 1960. The new government under President Philibert Tsiranana asked him to join a number of ministries, namely minister of economy, industry, mines and power; then minister of agriculture; and then minister of state for foreign affairs. He also took the post of Vice President.

== Later years ==
Rabemanajara was again exiled after the 1972 revolution, but this was his choice and he was not to return for 20 years. He died in France on April 2, 2005.

== Major works ==
=== Poetry ===
- Sur les marches du soir. Gap: Ophrys, 1940.
- Rites millénaires. Paris: Seghers, 1955.
- Antsa. Paris: Présence Africaine, 1956.
- Lamba. Paris: Présence Africaine, 1956.
- Antidote. Paris: Présence Africaine, 1961.
- Les ordalies, sonnets d'outre-temps. Paris: Présence Africaine, 1972.
- Oeuvres complètes, poésie. Paris: Présence Africaine, 1978.
- Thrènes d'avant l'aurore: Madagascar. Paris: Présence Africaine, 1985.
- Rien qu'encens et filigrane. Paris: Présence Africaine, 1987.

=== Essays ===
- Témoignage malgache et nationalisme. Paris: Présence Africaine, 1956.
- Nationalisme et problèmes malgaches. Paris: Présence Africaine, 1958.

=== Plays ===
- Les dieux malgaches. Gap: Ophrys, 1947.
- Agape des dieux Tritiva: Une tragédie. Paris: Présence Africaine, 1962.
- Les boutriers de l'aurore. Paris: Présence Africaine, 1957.

== Prizes ==
- 1988: Grand prix de la francophonie
- 1997: Salon de la Plume Noire (Paris, 10-12 octobre), consacré au poète Jacques Rabemananjara
- Member of "l'Academie Nationale des Arts, des Lettres et des Sciences de Madagascar"

== See also ==
- Ny Avana Ramanantoanina
- Jean-Joseph Rabearivelo
- Dox Razakandrainy
- Elie Rajaonarison
- Aimé Césaire
- Léon Damas
- Harlem Renaissance
