= Esther Razanadrasoa =

Malagasy novelist (1892–1931)

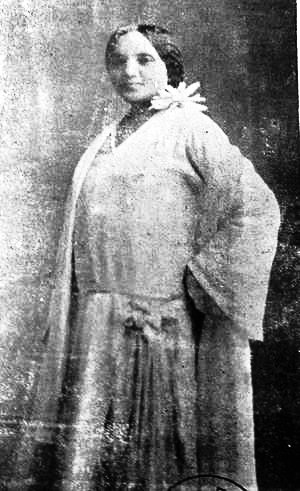
Esther Razanadrasoa

Esther Razanadrasoa, pen name Anja-Z (1892–1931), was a Malagasy poet and novelist who wrote in the Malagasy language. She was also the editor in chief of the literary journal Tsara Hafatra.

== Biography ==
Born in Antananarivo, Madagascar in 1892, Esther Razanadrasoa was brought up in a Hova environment by a father who was a journalist, writer and composer, and by a mother who inspired her to adopt the pen name of Anja-Z. Following in her father's footsteps, she wrote novels, plays and poetry. While her poetry was not published during her lifetime, she published a number of novels, several of them considered highly successful. She was also editor in chief of the Malagasy literary journal Tsara Hafatra. Much of her poetry is in the kindriandina tradition, consisting of romantic thoughts and aspirations as frequently practised by young Hova women.

In her novel L'Orage, the Swiss writer Douna Loup tells the story of Esther Razanadrasoa and her lover Jean-Joseph Rabearivelo, a budding local poet. It is based mainly on some 1,200 pages of his diary which revealed that Esther lived an exceptionally free life for a woman in the 1920s, marrying quite late.

Following her untimely death on 14 April 1931, Rabearivelo told of his close relationship with Razanadrasoa and published three of her poems which he had translated into French. According to Rabearivelo's own account, she died from the abortive substances she took in an attempt to prevent pregnancy after sleeping with him.
