= Lasary =

Type of Malagasy salad

Lasary is a type of Malagasy salad. It is believed that the dish originates from northern Madagascar. The dish is also named Antsary or Ansary in some places.

It is popular as a side dish or as the filling of a baguette sandwich. It can also be added to skewers and rice.

In the mountains, it is made up of green beans, cabbage, carrots and onion in a vinaigrette sauce. In urban areas, it is made with pickled mangoes and lemons.
