= Dox (poet) =

Malagasy writer (1913-1978)

- Born: Jean Verdi Salomon Razakandraina; 13 January 1913; Manankavaly, Madagascar
- Died: 14 June 1978 (aged 65); Antananarivo, Madagascar
- Occupations: Poet, writer
- Writing career
- Literary movement: Romanticism

Jean Verdi Salomon Razakandraina (1913–1978), commonly known as Dox, was a Malagasy writer and poet considered one of the most important literary figures in the country's history. He is principally renowned for his poetry and plays, but was also a painter, wrote and performed musical compositions, and translated several major French and English language works into Malagasy. His works have formed part of the language arts curriculum in Madagascar at every grade level since the country regained independence in 1960.

Dox began writing in 1930 while studying at a fine arts school in Antananarivo, where fellow students gave him the nickname "Dox". In 1932, after briefly conceding to his father's wish that he study medicine, Dox dedicated himself fully to the arts and joined with other notable Malagasy poets in advancing the Mitady ny very movement ('search for lost values'), launched by Jean-Joseph Rabearivelo, Charles Rajoelisolo and Ny Avana Ramanantoanina. His work during this period reflected the movement's aim to reaffirm the value of Malagasy identity, which had been eroded under the influence of the French colonial administration. In 1941, he printed his first collection of poems, Ny Hirako, which was written in the Malagasy language. When a major nationalist uprising erupted in 1947, Dox rallied behind the Mouvement démocratique de la rénovation malgache and suffered a gunshot wound during a protest. He also actively took part in the student protests of 1972 that brought down the Tsiranana administration. In 1971 he published his only compilation of French language poems, Chants Capricorniens. Throughout his career, he produced nine poem anthologies, numerous books in prose, and sixteen plays featuring folk tales, Biblical stories or Malagasy historical themes, in addition to countless privately commissioned works.

Throughout his life, Dox enjoyed strong popular support for his work, which combined elements of romanticism and the sensibilities of traditional Malagasy poetry and proverbs. He established himself as a leader in the promotion of Malagasy literary arts, co-founding the Union of Malagasy Poets and Writers and Tsiry, an association dedicated to publishing the works of creative Malagasy youth. Dox also served as President of the Committee of United Malagasy Artists, Vice President of the Andrianampoinimerina Academy, and a member of the Académie Malgache. He died in Antananarivo on 14 June 1978.

== Biography ==
=== Childhood ===
Jean Verdi Salomon Razakandraina was born on 13 January 1913 in Manankavaly, Madagascar, to an observant Christian family of the noble class. His father, Samuel Salomon, was a medical doctor and frequently traveled to care for patients. His mother, Raolina, moved to the nearby town of Antsirabe with young Jean Verdi, who was often ill as a child. There she entrusted his education to her father, a farmer and schoolteacher, who provided his elementary education, taught him Malagasy proverbs and stories, introduced him to Christianity, and taught him to paint and play music. Razakandrainy's grandfather taught him the history of their royal family line and the people of the Anjanapara valley in southern Imerina. This education instilled in the child a traditional love of the land, respect for ancestral traditions, and appreciation for the beauty of the Malagasy countryside.

In 1930, he enrolled at the École des Beaux-Arts in Antananarivo. The following year he transferred to the illustrious Paul Minault middle school, a private Protestant institution that had earned a reputation as a center for intellectual and creative excellence, partly because the school featured well-known thought leaders like nationalist poet Pastor Ravelojaona among their teaching staff. Its reputation also derived from its innovative teaching methods, based on individual reading and research, followed by debates guided by the teacher. This focus on reading allowed Razakandraina to discover a range of French novelists, among whom his favorites were Victor Hugo, Alfred de Musset, Charles Baudelaire, and Albert Samain. While enrolled at Paul Minault, Razakandraina was given two nicknames: Sorajavona ("colors of the clouds", an acronym formed from the initials of his name), and later Dox, from both the English "ox", and from "paradox".

The school had a student-run journal for publishing student works, and weekly sessions for showcasing student artistic talent. These avenues provided Razakandraina the opportunity to publish his first works of poetry, which were composed in the romantic genre, and write and organize the performance of his first theatrical plays. During this period, his poetry explored themes of sensuality, desire and love. While this earned him commendation from peers and other poets of his generation, he was reprimanded by his high school teacher and respected poet, Pastor Ravelojaona, who declared "it is inappropriate for Christians to exalt love in their poetry." Although his first theater troupe also enjoyed popular success, and performed in both Antananarivo at the Centre Culturel Albert Camus and in the coastal city of Toamasina, it was soon disbanded upon the insistence of his father, who wished his son to pursue a career in medicine as he had.

=== Early period ===
Dox abandoned his studies in medicine in favor of agriculture, which gave him the freedom to focus on writing poetry. He moved to Mandoto, where he worked as a farmer and continued to develop his art. There he met Perle Razanabololona, and the couple married and started a family. In 1932, he joined with other notable Malagasy poets in advancing the Mitady ny very movement ('search for lost values'), launched by Jean-Joseph Rabearivelo, Charles Rajoelisolo and Ny Avana Ramanantoanina, which exalted precolonial Malagasy identity and culture. Many of the poems Dox wrote in Mandoto were published in literary journals printed in Antananarivo, such as Ny Mpandinika, Ny Tantsinanana, Ny Fandrosoam-Baovao, Ny Kintan'ny Maraina, and Lakolosy Volamena. In 1941, he printed his first collection of poems, Ny Hirako. When the nationalist uprising erupted in 1947, Dox rallied behind the Mouvement démocratique de la rénovation malgache (for which his father was the secretary of the Antsirabe branch), and suffered a gunshot wound during a protest.

=== Late period ===
Several family members of Dox's died in the subsequent decade. The poet successively lost two children, his father, and then his wife in 1954. Dox gave up his work as a farmer and concentrated his energy on writing, often working as a newspaper vendor to make ends meet. He started his own newspaper, Sakaizan'ny Mpianatra, which was short-lived. In 1952, he co-founded the Union of Malagasy Poets and Writers (Union des Poètes et Écrivains Malgaches; UPEM). A publishing house he launched in 1955, Imprimerie Mazava, proved a short term venture. He also co-founded Tsiry, an association dedicated to publishing the works of creative Malagasy youth. In the early 1960s, Dox translated three major novels from French to Malagasy: El Cid (1961), Horace (1962) and Andromaque (1964). He omitted several passages of El Cid, most likely believing they would not find appeal in the Malagasy cultural milieu. The popularity and quality of his poetry led the Ministry of Education to include it in the national curriculum beginning shortly after independence in 1960.

In 1971 he published his only compilation of French language poems, Chants Capricorniens, which included a number of hainteny translated into French. He actively took part in the student protests of 1972 that brought down the Tsiranana administration, appearing at protests and publishing poems in favor of the popular cause. He applied his art to champion the causes of the most marginalized and disempowered segments of the population. During this time, he wrote and performed numerous songs, often in collaboration with major stars of the period, including Wilson Ramaroson, Naly Rakotofiringa, Fredy Raolifahanana, Bessa, and Dédé Sorajavona; many of these songs were highly successful and have become classics.

Dox was named President of the Komitin'ny Artista Malagasy Mitambatra ('Committee of United Malagasy Artists'; K.A.MA.MI.) and Vice President of the Andrianampoinimerina Academy, then became member of the Académie Malgache on 28 August 1975.

On 14 June 1978, an unknown individual bumped into Dox on the stairway between the Analakely and Ambondrona neighborhoods of Antananarivo. The poet lost his balance and died from injuries sustained while tumbling down the stairs. He is interred in the family tomb at Anjanapara, several kilometers outside Antsirabe.

== Style and influences ==
Academic Dominique Ranaivoson characterized his poetry in two broad categories. The first category are poems that are imbued with rich detail of daily life, using short stanzas and simple vocabulary. These poems recall the Malagasy poetic tradition of hainteny with their emphasis on nostalgia and longing. The second category consists of poems that offer philosophical musings on the nature of identity, and are rich with Malagasy proverbs and Madagascar's symbolic places and objects. Both types reflected the sensibilities and conventions of romanticism. The majority of the poetic works written by Dox were in the form of sonnets. He would frequently compose poems spontaneously and give them away to friends or passers by. His work often explored the theme of "Malagasy love" (amour à la Malgache), and he was among the first Malagasy poets to write on themes related to sexuality and desire. The themes of Malagasy identity and everyday beauty also feature prominently in his work. According to writer François-Xavier Razafimahatratra, the former theme allowed the poet to express his personal vision of the world, while the latter allowed him to use poetry to educate the Malagasy public.

Dox wrote prolifically over the course of his career, yielding nine poem anthologies, numerous books in prose, and sixteen plays along Biblical themes or Malagasy history and folk tales. In addition, he wrote a number of plays on commission for various clients, with many commissioned by Boy Scout troupes, although these have since been lost. His translation from French to Malagasy of three major Western novels was significant because they enriched Malagasy literature by introducing elements of the novel form that had never before been attempted in Malagasy language. These efforts demonstrated to other Malagasy language writers the versatility of the language and the possibility that it could be used for any literary form.

== Legacy ==
It is difficult to imagine the capital position that Dox occupies in the Malagasy collective consciousness... His place in the Malagasy literary and artistic milieu is that of a highly respected elder. He is part of a generation of poets that profoundly marked the history and literature of the Great Island.

— Claire Riffard

The Dictionnaire universel des littératures (1994) describes Dox as the "Verlaine or Baudelaire of Madagascar". The works of Dox have formed part of the public school curriculum in Madagascar from primary to university level since independence in 1960. Similarly, many of the songs composed and performed by Dox are considered classics in Madagascar.

== Works ==
Poetry:

- Ny Hirako. 1941.
- Hira Va? Antananarivo: Imprimerie Faneva, 1949; Imarivolanitra, 1970.
- Rakimalala. Antananarivo: Imprimerie Mazava, 1955.
- Ny Fitiavany. 1957.
- Fahatsiarovan-tena. 1958.
- Telomiova. 1959.
- Folihala. 1968.
- Dindona Fitia. 1973; 2005.
- Chants Capricorniens. 1975; Éditions du CIDST, 1991; 1995.

Theatrical plays:

- Amboninkazo. 1945.
- Apokalipsy. 1957.
- Amina Batsola, tantara mampangitakitaka nisy marina tokoa taminʹny andron-dRanavalona III. Antananarivo: Imprimerie Mazava, 1957.
- Mavo Handray Fanjakana. 1958.
- Tsimihatsaka. 1960.
- Savik'Ombalahy. 1960.
- Ny Ombalahibemaso. 1960.
- Ny Andron'Andrianampoinimerina. 1961.
- Andriamihaja. 1961.
- Rasalama Martiora. 1961.
- Rainandriamampandry. 1962.
- Ataon-karena inona aho? Bedohoka sy Rondro ary Imalo. 1962.
- Varavaran'ny Fahazavana. 1968.
- Tritriva. (sd).
- Ravahiny Maritiora. (sd).
- Estera. (sd).

Prose:

- Izy Mirahavavy. 1946; 1967; 2005.
- Solemita, na Tsantan-ny fitia (namboarina tamin-ny tononkiran-i Solomona). Antananarivo: Imprimerie Faneva, 1949.
- Izy Mirahalahy. 1958.
- Mangidy nefa mamy. 1962.
- Iarivo. 1965.
- Voninkazon'ny tanteraka. Antananarivo: Imprimerie Mazava, 1955.

Discography:

- Fo mihira, UPEM-HAVATSA poets reciting the works of Dox. Audio CD. France, 2006.
- Dox, Sorajavona. Audio CD. Label Bleu, Antananarivo.

Translations by Dox: French to Malagasy language:

- El Cid, Pierre Corneille: Ilay Andrianina, performed in 1958, published in 1965.
- Horace, Pierre Corneille.
- Polyeucte, Pierre Corneille.
- Andromaque, Racine: Ny Avelon'ny vady lalaina sa ny Ain'ny menaky ny aina?

English to Malagasy language:

- Itomanio, ry fireneko (Cry, the Beloved Country), Alan Paton, (1958).
- Romeo and Juliet, William Shakespeare (sd).

== See also ==
- Jean-Joseph Rabearivelo
- Jacques Rabemananjara
- Ny Avana Ramanantoanina
- Aimé Césaire
- Léon Damas
- Harlem Renaissance
