= Rašeta =

Rašeta is a Serbian and Croatian surname. Notable people with this surname include:

- Andrija Rašeta (born 1934), Yugoslavian military commander
- Boško Rašeta, a leader of the Srb uprising
- Marija Rašeta Vukosavljević, Serbian statesman

== See also ==
- Joseph Raseta, Malagasy politician
