= Malagasy Academy =

Madagascar institution

The Malagasy Academy (Académie Malgache) is a public institution in Madagascar responsible for the study of the country's culture and customs, including studies in Madagascar's linguistics, ethnology and sociology, as well as literary, artistic, historical, and scientific issues. It is Africa's oldest academy, established on 23 January 1902 by Joseph Gallieni, the first governor general of Madagascar. The academy shares its research in two publications: Bulletin de l'Académie Malgache and Mémoires de l'Académie Malgache. Between its inception and 2012, approximately 1,100 members had attended the institution, and as of 2012, it had 280 members, some of which were international. It hosts literary and scientific symposia, and also offers dictation and a science competitions.

== See also ==
- Madagascar reviews outcomes of UNESCO-ICCROM-ICOM Madagascar ‘Re-Org’ preventive conservation programme,25/10/2021
