= Ambatofotsy =

- Location in Madagascar
- Coordinates: 21°45′S 47°29′E
- Country: Madagascar
- Region: Fitovinany
- District: Ikongo
- Elevation: 328 m (1,076 ft)

Population (2001)
  - Total: 26,000
- Time zone: UTC3 (EAT)
- Climate: Af

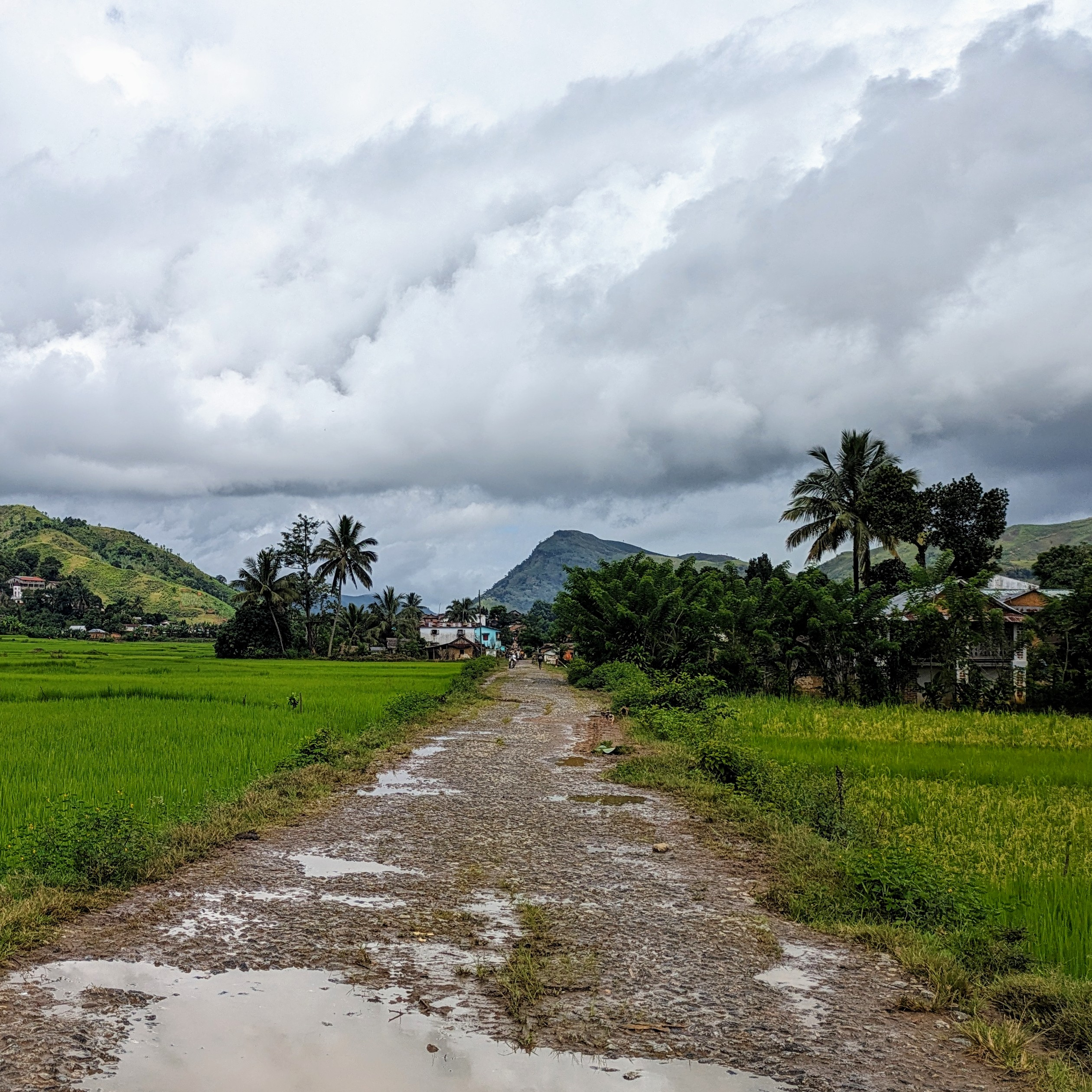
North entrance to Ambatofotsy

Ambatofotsy is a town and commune in Madagascar. It belongs to the district of Ikongo, which is a part of Fitovinany region. The population of the commune was estimated to be approximately 26,000 in 2001 commune census.

Primary and junior level secondary education are available in town. The majority 90% of the population of the commune are farmers. The most important crops are coffee and rice, while other important agricultural products are maize and cassava. Services provide employment for 10% of the population.
