= Hainteny =

Traditional form of Malagasy oral literature and poetry

Hainteny (pronounced [hajnˈteɲ], Malagasy for "knowledge of words") is a traditional form of Malagasy oral literature and poetry, involving heavy use of metaphor. It is associated primarily with the Merina people of Madagascar. In its use of metaphor and allusion it resembles another type of poetry, the Malay pantun, and Fox suggests "it seems likely the Merina brought with them a Malayo-Polynesian poetic tradition" to Madagascar. The Ibonia, an epic poem related for centuries in different versions across Madagascar, reflects the value placed on the linguistic skills celebrated in the hainteny tradition, and offers insight into the diverse mythologies and beliefs of traditional Malagasy communities.

Collections of hainteny were first gathered in print form on the orders of Queen Ranavalona I in the 19th century. The French writer Jean Paulhan, who stayed in Madagascar from 1908 to 1910, made an intensive study of the hainteny and published a book of translations in 1913.

Hainteny often incorporates ohabolana (proverbs) and kabary (public discourse). Both of these two oral traditions remain integral parts of Malagasy daily life, where they are pronounced at such events as weddings, funerals, births and famadihana and constitute an essential component of hiragasy performances. They may also include angano (folktales and fables), tantara (historical narratives) or ankamantatra (riddles). These diverse Malagasy oral traditions were advanced in the 20th century by such artists as Jean Joseph Rabearivelo, who is considered Africa's first modern poet, and Elie Rajaonarison, an exemplar of the new wave of Malagasy poetry.

== Ohabolana ==
"Proverb" offers a weak approximation of the meaning of ohabolana, which constitute no less than concise expressions of the Malagasy philosophical worldview. While the exact number of existing ohabolana is unknown, the largest published collection includes over 6,500 of them relating to all aspects of life and particularly the human condition. Fox has described ohabolana as constituting "a universal philosophy of life that transcends its Malagasy context and merits admiration as one of man's noble attempts to construct a valid moral and philosophical framework for his existence." Ohabolana are not the property of a particular class but are rather at the disposition of anyone who finds a salient application of a particular expression to a given situation. Their form persists unchanged from ancient times even when grammar and syntax of contemporary speech have since evolved because, as Fox notes, altering an ohabolana would constitute disregard for the venerated ancestors who are their originators. Ohabolana are characteristically brief, metaphorical, symmetrical in pattern and syntax.
Examples:

Manasa lamba be tseroka; na madio aza, mangarahara.—Washing a very dirty dress: even though it gets clean, it becomes full of holes.

Ny tsiny toy ny rivotra: mikasika ny tena, fa tsy hita tarehy.—Blame is like the wind: felt but not seen.
Ny voky tsy mahaleo ny tsaroana.—A good belly-full doesn't equal a kind remembrance.

Aza asesiky ny fitia tanteraka, ka tsy mahalala ny ranonorana ho avy.—Don't be so much in love that you can't tell when the rain is coming.

== Kabary ==
The tradition of kabary in Madagascar, which predates Merina King Andrianampoinimerina (1787–1810), nonetheless owes much of its modern form, usage and meaning to standards set at his court. Kabary is a highly stylized form of speech that has formed an important part of Malagasy culture for centuries. One who speaks kabary is known as mpikabary. Skill in this form of ceremonial public speaking—in which ohabolana proverbs play a privileged role—is highly esteemed and one who shows himself to be a tompon'ny kabary (master of kabary) enjoys a higher level of respect and even authority. According to the classic collection of Malagasy folklore "Tantara ny Andriana eto Madagasikara" the right to rule could even be determined by one's eloquence and skills in kabary, to the point where tompon'ny kabary and sovereign become interchangeable concepts:

We understand therein the function of the kabary:

there is a master of the words,
there is somebody who answers.
It is the master of the words who rules the kingdom;
As for the one who answers to the kabary,

it is the public acknowledgment of his submission.

Kabary forms an integral part of numerous important social ceremonies, including marriage, famadihana, circumcision and burial. By choosing to use the kabary speech style, a speaker can render any situation more formal and ceremonial, such as can happen when expressing condolences, offering thanks, formally addressing a gathering or giving a political address. To this day, skill in kabary can play a deciding role in the success of a Malagasy politician's career.

Kabary may be delivered by two or more mpikabary at the same occasion, and each one generally was nominated by and represents a portion of the audience present, as during hiragasy performances. When this happens, kabary speech can take on somewhat competitive overtones as the speakers attempt to demonstrate their superior skills. The mpikabary typically addresses himself to the audience of his opponent, and while direct confrontation is generally frowned upon in polite society in the Highlands of Madagascar, if an opponent mpikabary makes an error in the form of the kabary or misstates an ohabolana, this is commonly pointed out in an indirect or delicate manner as evidence of greater mastery. The use of indirect language such as proverbs is viewed as the more challenging, adult manner of speaking and demonstrates skill, while direct criticism, bluntness, hateful speech or anything that causes loss of face to the audience or a rival speaker is censured and despised as lacking in skill. Kabary is generally the domain of men and not women, because women are believed and expected to speak in a more straightforward way—including the expression of anger that can cause loss of face to the speaker—while men are expected to preserve face by taking the time to choose their words carefully when speaking to others. Nonetheless, some women may exceptionally engage in kabary (for instance, all queens), although men represent the vast majority of mpikabary.
