= List of Malagasy musicians =

This is a list of notable Malagasy musicians and musical groups.

- AmbondronA
- Denise
- Vaiavy Chila
- Mily Clément
- Ninie Doniah
- Rakoto Frah
- D'Gary
- Régis Gizavo
- Eusèbe Jaojoby
- Lego
- Mahaleo
- Erick Manana
- Jerry Marcoss
- Toto Mwandjani
- Naïka
- Oladad
- Rabaza
- Naka Rabemanantsoa
- Andrianary Ratianarivo
- Olombelona Ricky
- Rossy
- Mama Sana
- Senge
- Madagascar Slim
- Tarika
- Tearano
- Justin Vali
- Nicolas Vatomanga
- Rajery
- Samoëla
- Seheno
