= Three Horses Beer =

Type of pale lager beer

Three Horses Beer (THB)
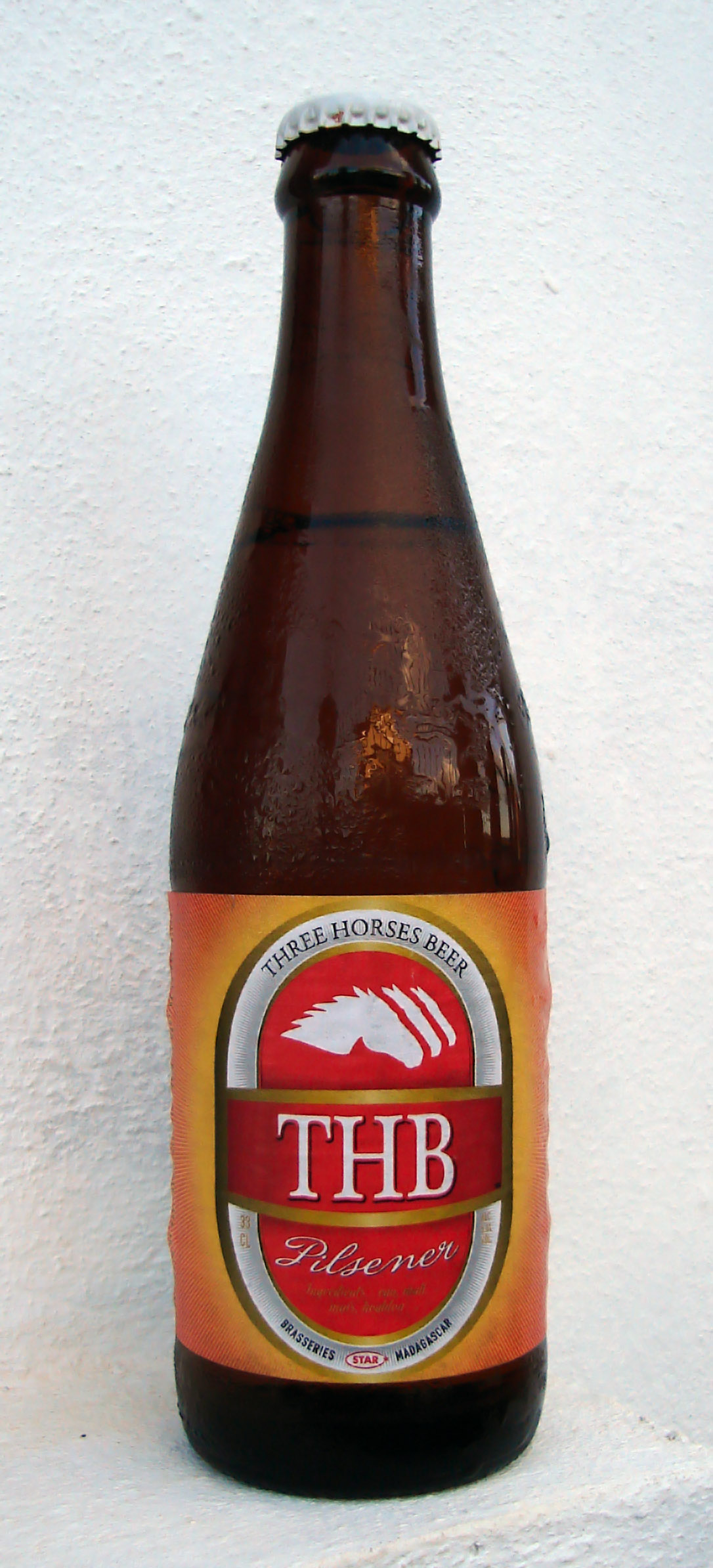
- Type: Pilsner
- Manufacturer: Star Breweries of Madagascar
- Origin: Madagascar
- Introduced: 1958
- Alcohol by volume: 5.4%
- Variants: THB Special (6.2%), THB Lite (1%), THB Fresh (1%)
- Website: (in French)

Three Horses Beer (better known locally as THB) is a pale lager that has been brewed by Star Breweries of Madagascar since 1958. It is the highest-selling beer in Madagascar and has been described as emblematic of the country. THB is sold nationwide and, since 2005, has been exported to such markets as France, Reunion Island, Comoros, and Mayotte. The Malagasy beer is produced at two breweries in Madagascar, the first centrally located in Antsirabe and the other in the northern city of Antsiranana. THB Pilsener, the most common variant of THB, has a light taste and is produced from mostly local barley, corn, and hops. Star Breweries also produces THB Fresh (a shandy with less than 1% alcohol), THB Special (6.2% alcohol), and THB Lite (1% alcohol). Recent investments in Star Brewery infrastructure have allowed a 20% increase in production since 2011.

After advertising alcohol in the media was banned under former President of Madagascar Marc Ravalomanana, Star Breweries has increasingly promoted THB through unconventional means. These have included sponsoring the THB Champions League, Madagascar's national football championship, and holding annual beer festivals. In addition, THB is a regular sponsor of local musicians through major annual festivals and tours. Star Breweries has also hired musicians to perform in music videos created to promote the beer. In 2014 the THB label was significantly redesigned, and in 2015, a new slogan, "THB eo foana e!" ("THB always!"), was promoted alongside the beer's longstanding trademark Soa Ny Fiarahantsika ("The Pleasure of Being Together"). Malagasy musical stars and other public figures regularly promote the beer.

== History ==
In 1953 the French company Rochefortaise launched Société Tananarivienne d'Articles Réfrigérés (STAR) (Antananarivo Company of Refrigerated Products) and its associated factory in Antananarivo, Madagascar, for the exclusive production and distribution of Coca-Cola in Madagascar. In 1957, a brewer was recruited to develop a local beer. After developing 17 different recipes, he travelled throughout the island to test each one using primarily local ingredients; the best of these was a pilsener chosen as the recipe to be produced at a Star brewery to be established in Antsirabe. The company first began producing Three Horses Beer (THB) in 1958.

In 1968, Star Breweries opened a factory in Antsiranana to produce and distribute THB, Coca-Cola, and other carbonated beverages throughout the island's northern region. In 1980, Star Breweries became partly state-owned; in 1989, Rochefortaise sold Star Breweries to Groupe Fraise, and the company obtained fully privatized status one year later. In 2005, the production of THB in cans began at the Star brewery in Antsirabe. In 2011 Groupe Fraise sold Star Breweries to French brewer Castel.

== Reception ==
In the Malagasy market, THB Pilsener remains the most popular Malagasy brand of beer and the most popular of any brand of beer sold in Madagascar. It is estimated that four liters per person are sold each year in Madagascar. THB has been described as an "emblem" of the country and a "national symbol". One Malagasy journalist described THB as symbolic of Fihavanana Malagasy, a cultural value that emphasizes the importance of brotherhood and friendship.

THB won its first international award in 1980 with a gold medal at the International Beverage Competitions in Vienna. Then later in 2004, came another gold medal at the Monde Sélection de Bruxelles (International Beverage Competition in Brussels, Belgium). In 2010, THB Pilsener was again recognized at this event, receiving the silver medal. THB Pilsener won a gold medal at the same competition in 2012, and the silver medal in 2015. THB Fresh also won a gold medal at the Monde Sélection de Bruxelles in 2012. More recently, THB Pilsner won another gold medal in 2016 at the "Monde Selection de Bruxelles".

== Production ==
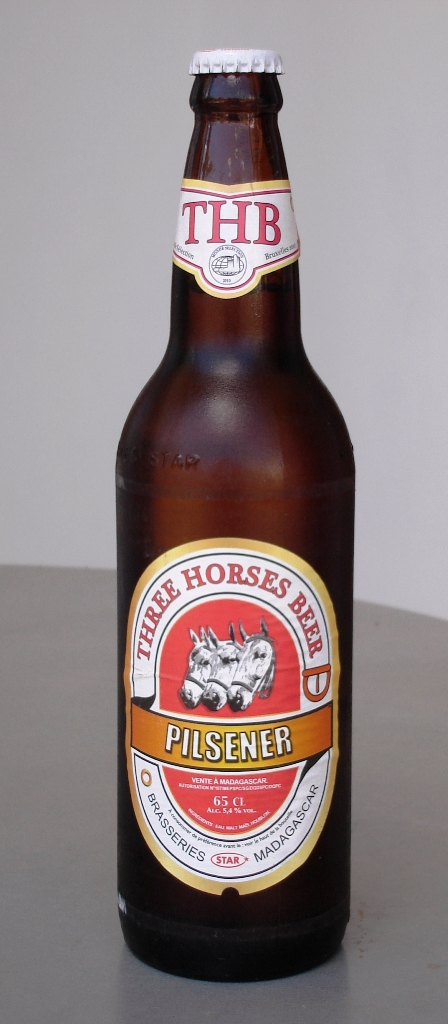
Pilsener label prior to 2014

THB Pilsener, the oldest and most popular THB beer, is a 5.4% abv pale lager light in color with a medium body, thin head, and balanced, mildly bitter flavor. THB Pilsener is sold in two sizes of returnable brown bottles: 33 centilitres (12 imp fl oz; 11 US fl oz) and 65 centilitres (23 imp fl oz; 22 US fl oz). The pilsener is also sold in 33 centilitres (12 imp fl oz; 11 US fl oz) and 50 centilitres (18 imp fl oz; 17 US fl oz) aluminum cans, and has been available on tap at commercial establishments in Madagascar since 2006. Star Breweries also produces THB Fresh, a shandy (locally called panaché), with less than 1% alcohol. It is only sold in 65 centilitres (23 imp fl oz; 22 US fl oz) glass bottles. The original Fresh shandy, which has a lemon taste, has also temporarily been offered in several other flavors, including mint, raspberry, and apple. Other variants include THB Special, with 6.2% alcohol, and THB Lite, a low alcohol beer (1%).

THB is produced in two breweries in Madagascar: the original brewery, located in Antsirabe, and a second in Antsiranana. Since its inception, THB has been sold in glass bottles tinted brown to protect the contents from the ultraviolet rays of the sun. The Antsirabe factory produces 100 million bottles and 100,000 cans of THB per year. Antsirabe was selected for the original brewery because the water there is low in calcium and other minerals, lending itself well to beer production. Ingredients for the production of THB are sourced throughout the island. Barley grown in nearby Betafo and Fianarantsoa is blended with corn and hops from Toliara to produce the beer. Over 2,500 tonnes of malt and 3,500 tonnes of corn are grown annually in the surrounding Vakinankaratra region for the production of THB. The MALTO collective of 7,000 farmers was formed around 1980 in Antsirabe to grow barley and transform it into malt for Star Breweries beer production. Particular special malts are used to produce variants on the original THB recipe, such as THB Special.

Fermentation of THB beer requires approximately eight hours for each mash of 130 hectoliters. The mash is a blend of malt (sprouted barley) and corn in an 80/20 ratio to which water and hops are added. The mash is heated in a vat for around two hours to support fermentation. The product is filtered and then heated to 100 degrees Celsius to concentrate and sterilize it. The beer is then decanted and cooled at 10 degrees Celsius for an hour. Finally, a type of mushroom is added as a leavening and fermenting agent; the beer is allowed to ferment for a full week, and excess carbon dioxide produced by the process is collected to produce soft drinks and other carbonated beverages at the factory. The beer is allowed to rest in vats for several more days before being filtered once more and then bottled and pasteurized at 62 degrees Celsius for three minutes. The automated bottling process yields THB crates ready for shipment to regional wholesale distribution points.

Star Breweries invested over four million euros into improving its factories in the 2009-11 period, resulting in a 20% increase in production capacity. These improvements included refurbishing the production line equipment, including higher-performing mixers and belts and a new bottle conveyor system. The Coca-Cola Company issued international HACCP certification to Star Breweries in 2010, confirming its adherence to international quality standards in beverage production. In 2011, Coca-Cola also awarded Star Breweries the Gold Medal among 27 competing African countries for the company's standards of quality and environmental protection in the production of its beer and other beverages. Frequent brownouts resulting from the overtaxed national power grid produce power cuts to the THB breweries that have negatively affected the volume and cost-effectiveness of production since the early 2000s.

== Distribution ==
Star Breweries distributes THB through a network of regional wholesalers who provide the product to local vendors. Orders are typically sent to the factories weekly and are filled within two weeks. In 2005 Star Breweries shifted manufacturing of THB in aluminum cans from Mauritius to Antsirabe to export the beer to international markets with high Malagasy expatriate populations, including France, Reunion Island, Comoros and Mayotte. All exported THB beer was packaged in aluminum cans manufactured at the Antsirabe brewery; canned THB was also made available alongside the traditional glass bottles in markets in Madagascar that same year. In 2006 the Star Brewery, which employs 1,500 staff, was producing 700,000 hectoliters of beer annually out of the total market share of 800,000; 550,000 hectoliters were produced at the Antsirabe Star Brewery alone. The Antsiranana factory employs 140 staff and produced 180,000 hectoliters of beer (24 million bottles) in 2010.

== Marketing ==
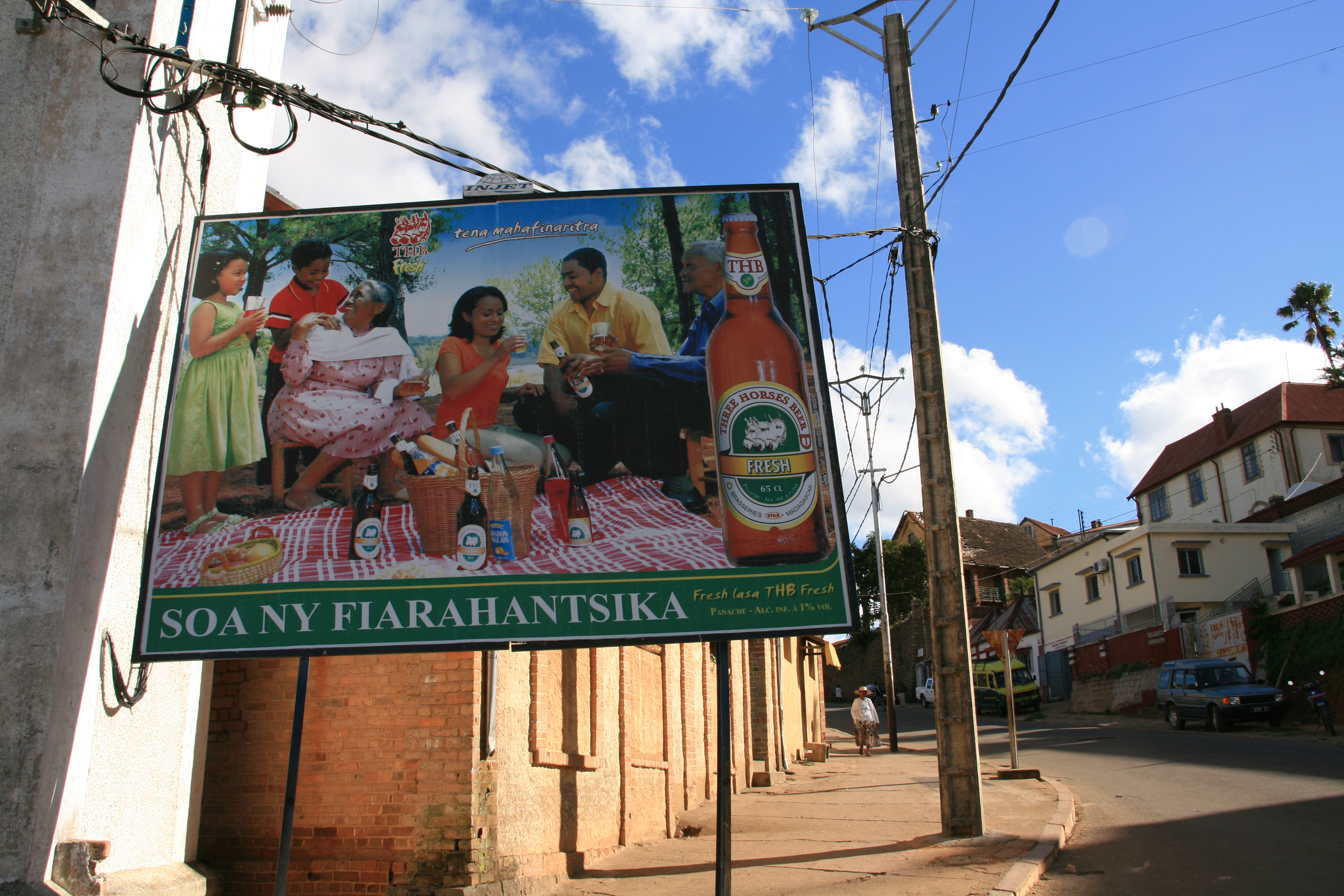
THB Fresh was exempted from President Marc Ravalomanana's ban on media advertisement of alcoholic beverages.

To create the original label for THB, Star Breweries opted to copy an existing label for a Dutch beer brand called The Holland Beer, which featured the image of three horses. This was done partly because of the association between Antsirabe and its history of horse breeding; the brand took the name Three Horses Beer based on this design. The label also features the brand's slogan, Soa Ny Fiarahantsika ("The Pleasure of Being Together"). The labels were originally printed in the Netherlands and shipped to Madagascar before eventually being produced on the local market; THB coasters continue to be produced in Europe. The bottle's color, shape, and label have changed over time. In 2005, the label was enlarged, and the colors brightened. The band around the neck of the bottle was also broadened with the addition of the image of a medal in honor of the beer's first international award in 2004. A new logo was adopted for the canned THB before being expanded in 2014 to the 33 cl bottled THB. The new logo features three stylized, outlined white horses, now facing right to represent a focus on the future. Red remains the predominant color.

Advertising alcohol on television and in the press was outlawed under Marc Ravalomanana. To maximize the brand recognition of THB, the company altered the label for its Fresh shandy, which was exempt from this ban due to its low alcohol content, to match the THB Pilsener design but using a green background instead of the pilsener's red. The pilsener is advertised in various non-traditional ways, such as celebrity promotion in music videos and music and sporting event sponsorship. THB is considered by the public as a promoter of Malagasy culture and identity, particularly through its sponsorship of its annual THB Tour traveling music festival and the THB fête de la bière (beer festival). Three Horses Beer sponsors the THB Champions League, the national football championship. Many popular musical artists have advertised THB, including superstars Jerry Marcoss, AmbondronA, Samoëla, Tsiliva, Tence Mena and Jaojoby.

THB launched its first website in 2008. In 2015, in honor of the 55th anniversary of national independence, Star Breweries launched a new campaign to promote the beer. The company announced a new slogan, "THB eo foana e!" (THB always!) to be promoted alongside its historic slogan. A song by the same name, written and performed by BIG MJ and the group Tambour Gasy, and an accompanying music video, will promote the beer and the new slogan.
