= Toto Mwandjani =

Malagasy guitarist and singer

- Born: Rafalison Mamiarilaza Claudin; Antsohihy, Madagascar
- Genres: Salegy, tsapiky, ndombolo
- Occupation(s): Guitarist, singer, songwriter
- Instrument(s): Electric guitar, voice

Toto Mwandjani is a Malagasy guitarist and singer who performs the traditional musical genres of tsapiky and salegy infused with Ndombolo music of the Democratic Republic of Congo.

Mwandjani, who was born in Antsohihy in north-west Madagascar, began playing guitar at age eight and formed a band called Les Jeunes Cobras. In 1994 he joined legendary group Feon'ala before becoming a high-demand musician at Studio Mars, the premier professional recording studio on the island. He formed the group Soley, gaining further acclaim for his unique adaptations of traditional musical styles. In the late 1990s after the dissolution of the band, Mwandjani was regularly invited to record and perform with the superstars of salegy, including Jaojoby, Mily Clément and Ninie Doniah.

His single "Malemilemy" elevated him to national stardom. He has recorded two albums and toured extensively in Madagascar and Europe.

Mwandjani has twice given concerts to represent Malagasy culture at the annual Days of Madagascar event held at UNESCO in Paris.

== See also ==
- Music of Madagascar
