= Rossy (musician) =

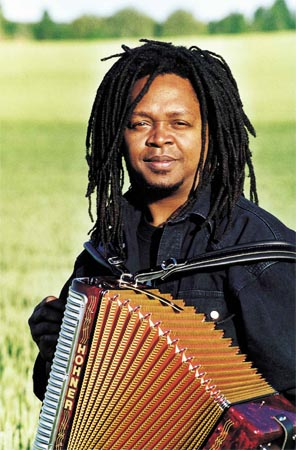

Background information
- Born: Paul Bert Rahasimanana; 20 September 1960 (age 66); Antananarivo, Madagascar
- Genres: Hira gasy, vakisôva, tapolaka
- Occupations: Singer, songwriter
- Instruments: Vocals, accordion

Paul Bert Rahasimanana (born 20 September 1960), better known as Rossy, is a Malagasy singer and songwriter. Beginning his musical career as an accordionist and singer within a traditional hira gasy musical troupe, Rossy performs a fusion of hira gasy instrumentation and vocal style with contemporary rock, funk and folk sounds to create a Malagasy genre of contemporary popular music. Rossy promoted former president Didier Ratsiraka through concert performances throughout his presidency and served within the Ministry of Culture to promote artists' rights and copyright law. When Ratsiraka fell into disfavor following the contentious 2001 Malagasy presidential elections, Rossy went into self-imposed exile in France. He returned to the island to give concerts beginning in 2008 and set an unbroken record of 35,000 tickets sold for a performance given that year. His compositions and style are frequently associated with the Ratsiraka socialist period and commonly evoke a sense of nostalgia among Malagasy fans.

== Early years ==
Paul Bert Rahasimanana was born in 1960 to a working-class family. At the age of seven, he was given an accordion as a gift and began teaching himself to play. In the early 1970s, Rahasimanana and a group of friends formed an a capella group called Hazo Midoroboka and began singing traditional consolatory songs (mamonjy jaobany) for those grieving at wakes held in their neighborhood of Ampamarinana in the Mahamasina district of Antananarivo. Mourners paid the members of the group in the form of free cups of coffee and fritters. Like many other urban youth from working class and poor neighborhoods, Rossy also performed soava and vakisova, contemporary and typically a capella urban genres that expressed incisive social critique through slang-laden, rapped lyrics with complex hand-clapping accompaniment. While a high school student in 1981 he formed his first band, using African percussion rather than a Western drum kit to set the rhythm. In 1983, Rossy gave his first public performance of a song he had composed in the lively vakisôva genre. The performance occurred in the courtyard of the historic Ecole Sainte Famille located in Mahamasina and was attended by local television host Tsilavina Ralaindimby, who brought him to the attention of the director of the Centre Germano-Malgache, who was sufficiently impressed to collaborate with WDR (the predecessor of Radio France Internationale) to organize a four-month series of performances for Rossy in Germany.

Rahasimanana's youth was colored by the socio-political currents prevailing across the island under President Didier Ratsiraka's socialist Second Republic. The young musician was molded by his impoverished background, instilling in him a concern for the struggles of the Malagasy lower classes and motivating him to rise above his family's humble origins. Favorably impressed by policies of the president's AREMA party that provided scholarships and other benefits to underprivileged youth members, Rahasimanana became an early and enduring supporter of the party and its president.

== Tapolaka ==
Following his first overseas concerts in Germany in 1983, Rossy's performed abroad in the United States, France, Japan, Russia, England and Canada. These performances allowed Rossy to become the first Malagasy artist to introduce European audiences in Berlin and Paris to the genre of salegy, although Jaojoby would go on to promote the genre much more widely and successfully. Rossy's open and enthusiastic support for Ratsiraka throughout his presidency assured Rossy's band regular performances in association with presidential functions.

He recorded his 1991 album Island of Ghosts at Peter Gabriel's Real World Studios in England. The following year he toured Europe with Rakoto Frah, an elderly player of the traditional sodina flute. His 1994 release, Bal kabosy, was a success in Madagascar and led Radio France International to award him a trophy, declaring him "The best ambassador of Malagasy music".

In 2001 he was named by Ratsiraka to the cabinet position of Cultural Adviser.

== Exile to France ==
During the course of the 2001 campaign a conflict arose between Rossy and the opposition candidate, then-mayor of Antananarivo Marc Ravalomanana, which manifested in such indirect ways as the ostracism of Rossy's bodyguards by influential Ravalomanana supporters. Rossy chose to spend time in France to allow the political standoff to run its course. When Ravalomanana was ultimately declared the winner of the election, Rossy anticipated a further deterioration in his relations with the new political, social and economic leaders of the capital, and made the decision to remain with his family in France until the situation improved. He stayed for six years without returning home to Madagascar. Minister of Culture Patrick Ramiaramanana (2007–08) attempted to prohibit Rossy from holding concerts in Madagascar. Despite the friction between Rossy and Ravalomanana, Ramiaramanana's efforts were condemned by the president, who relieved the minister of his post.

During Rossy's self-exile in France, he continued to focus on projects. He contributed to the album Vie Sauvage by French artist Antoine, and performed a concert in 2003 with Blankass, a French rock group.

== Return to Madagascar ==
In 2008 Rossy returned to Madagascar, giving a series of concerts at Mahamasina Stadium in Antananarivo. These concerts were wildly successful; the first sold over 35,000 tickets, a number that in 2013 remained unsurpassed by any other Malagasy artist. He lives in Antananarivo with his family and gives regular performances. In addition, he serves as cultural adviser to the administration of Andry Rajoelina, current interim head of state for the High Transitional Authority following the 2009 Malagasy political crisis that removed Ravalomanana from power.

== Style and influences ==
Rossy's style draws its influences from musical genres across the island of Madagascar, including salegy, kwassa-kwassa, hira gasy, and vakisôva, as well as foreign genres ranging from reggae and soukous to pop and rock. The instrumentation of a typical Rossy song combines electric bass guitar and drum kit with a variety of Malagasy musical elements, most commonly including the brass section of a hira gasy troupe, an amplified kabosy guitar, accordion, folk instruments like the valiha or marovany, and traditional hand-clapping rhythms prominent in such local genres as salegy and vakisôva. Rossy and 1970s Malagasy folk rock group Mahaleo were the first mainstream artists to integrate the kabosy into contemporary Malagasy pop music.

The accordion is Rossy's preferred instrument and the one he most often plays himself during live performances. He also plays the sodina flute, guitar and valiha.

Like many other urban youth growing up in the working-class neighborhoods of Antananarivo, Rossy casually improvised with his friends to create songs in the vakisôva genre. This contemporary Malagasy musical genre is characterized by politically and socially incisive lyrics delivered a capella in a rhythmic, rap-like style over complex hand-clapping beats. Long after vakisôva performance launched his career, Rossy continued to draw upon its rhythms and sensibilities as a vehicle for expressing bold political and social critique while capitalizing on the genre's dance-inducing entertainment value. As a consequence, by the time he had achieved national popularity under his stage name Rossy in the early 1990s, he had developed a reputation for speaking truth to power and being unafraid to address sensitive issues through his music. Many of Rossy's songs raise awareness of such issues as environmental degradation and poor governance.

== Other activities ==
The Studio Pro recording studio was established by Rossy in Antananarivo to improve the quality of locally produced musical recordings, as well as to provide local artists with greater access to low-cost recording facilities. The studio's low-cost, high quality recording capability has enabled artists with limited capital, such as the hira gasy troupe Ramilison Fenoarivo, to record and distribute their work to commercial success.

Rossy has also worked to promote Malagasy music by organizing concerts, music festivals and dance events showcasing the diverse musical traditions of the island.

In November 2012, Rossy opened Le Toit de la culture, a center for the promotion of traditional Malagasy cultural arts. Located in a building in the Mahamasina Stadium complex, the center hosts regular arts events and houses a school for Malagasy accordion performance.

== Politician ==
In 2014 he was elected as a member of parliament in the 2013 Malagasy parliamentary elections for the constituency of Antananarivo. He was reelected in 2018 but lost the seat in the 2024 Malagasy parliamentary elections.

== Discography ==
Title	Released	Label	Tracks (Length)
Mitapolaka	2011	Studio ProRossy	12 (43'55")
Ino Vaovao	2007	Studio ProRossy	12
Gasy'car (Tsarabest of Rossy)	2002	Melodie	12 (54'51")
Lehibe ny ankizy	2001	-	13
Iaô !	2000	Studio ProRossy	14 (50'22")
Aoira	1998	Mars	10 (42'05")
Lera	1996	Editions Pro	13 (49'46")
Bal kabosy	1994	Mars	10 (41'28")
Madagascar Spirit	1993	Anima Music	-
Madagascar I	1993	Globe Style Records	-
One Eye on the Future, One Eye on the Past	1992	Shanachie	17 (64'00")
Island of Ghosts	1991	Real World	17 (48'20")
Madagascar	1988	Celluloid	19 (69'47")
Nehmt die Kabosy, spielt die Valiha: Lieder aus Madagaskar	1983	Fun Records	-

== See also ==
- Music of Madagascar
