= Wawa (Malagasy musician) =

- Born: Madagascar
- Genres: Salegy
- Occupation(s): Singer, songwriter
- Instrument: Voice

Wawa is a performer and composer of salegy, a genre of music from the northern coastal region of Madagascar. He is among the most popular contemporary salegy artists and has recorded songs in collaboration with numerous other Malagasy artists. In 2011 he released an album of traditional salegy, featuring kabosy, marovany and traditional percussion accompaniment. Wawa enjoys strong popularity among Malagasy audiences both domestically and within the diaspora, and regularly tours at home and abroad. In 2010 the band completed extensive tours to sold-out audiences in France and Madagascar. A music reviewer for Midi Madagasikara described Wawa in 2013 as the "perfect entertainer, who never ceases to perform at the highest levels."

== See also ==
- Music of Madagascar
