= Salala (band) =

- Origin: Madagascar
- Genres: Beko
- Years active: 1983-present
- Members: M'Bassa

Salala is an a capella vocal trio from the south of Madagascar. They perform a contemporary form of the traditional beko genre, which originates from the island's southern interior. In contrast to the traditional beko, a spiritual chant sung at funerals to honor the life of the deceased, Salala adapted the harmonies and style of the genre while shedding the religious purpose of the music by focusing the subject of their songs on matters of daily life. The group was founded by one of the singers, M'Bassa, in 1983, with singer Senge and a friend. All three performers belong to the southern Antandroy ethnic group and originate from a small village near Taolagnaro. Over the next ten years, the group gained in popularity in Madagascar, eventually winning the "Gasitsara Media Prize" for Best Band of the Year. Their first major domestic hit was "Salakao Raho Ene". The group went on to perform the Africolor music festival in 1994, where they were well received. In 1995 they recorded their first album, Salala, and were selected to represent the Indian Ocean states at the "Découvertes du Printemps de Bourges" tour, performing at 25 venues across France and Germany with Oumou Sangaré. After this success, the group's bass vocalist, Senge, launched a solo career, eventually teaming up with two other singers to lead his own trio, while still performing and recording with Salala. The band toured Africa in 1996, visiting the Seychelles, Uganda, Kenya, Rwanda, Malawi, Zambia, Namibia and South Africa. They performed at the third Jeux de la Francophonie in Madagascar in 1997 and toured Singapore in 1998. In 1999, Salala toured Reunion island with Granmoun Lélé.

Salala released their second and last album, Benaombe, in 2000, just prior to the death of Senge following a battle with cancer. Since Senge's death, the band has regularly performed around the world. From 2001 to 2004, the group promoted their second album with regular performances across Madagascar. From 2005 to 2007, M'Bassa partnered with the Alliance Francaise of Madagascar to promote southern music in association with Francis Cabrel's "Voix du Sud" project, performing at Alliance Francaise centers throughout the island and in Burundi. The band toured Madagascar and France in 2008, and returned to tour France again in 2010.

== See also ==
- Music of Madagascar
