= Ny Antsaly =

- Origin: Madagascar
- Genres: Vakodrazana
- Members: Rémi Randafison; Bernard Razafindrakoto; Sylvestre Randafison

Ny Antsaly is a band that performed traditional vakodrazana music from the central highlands of Madagascar. The band is considered Madagascar's first internationally acclaimed touring musical group. Ny Antsaly performed for several European sovereigns in the 1960s, and also gave a concert for the National Eisteddfod of Wales in 1962.

== See also ==
- Music of Madagascar
