= Lokanga =

Lokanga may refer to:

- Several dissimilar or unrelated Malagasy musical instruments:
  - Lokanga bara, a three-string fiddle
  - Lonkago voatavo, a stick zither attached to a gourd
