= Jarifa =

- Born: Madagascar
- Genres: Tsapiky
- Occupation(s): Singer, songwriter
- Instrument: Voice

Jarifa is a singer and composer of Tsapiky music from the southern coastal area of Madagascar. He has released several albums in Madagascar and regularly gives concerts across the island. He achieved a nationwide success with his single "Dango Dango" in 2004.

Jarifa "Dangodango" (2003)
Tsapika as performed by Jarifa

== See also ==
- Music of Madagascar
