= Terakaly =

- Origin: Madagascar
- Genres: Beko, tsapiky

Terakaly is a musical group from the southwestern region of Madagascar. They perform a contemporary blend of traditional music from the region, including beko and tsapiky. The band enjoyed nationwide success with its first single, "Avia Mouna", which was released in 1999. After a period of intense popularity, the band lost ground to other new artists and only regained nationwide exposure with the release of a new album in 2009. The band was a launching point for several other successful artists, most notably including Tsiliva, who ranks among the most popular contemporary performers of the kilalaka genre.

== See also ==
- Music of Madagascar
