= Rabemanantsoa =

Rabemanantsoa is a Malagasy surname. Notable people with the surname include:

- Naka Rabemanantsoa, Malagasy pianist and composer
- Radoniaina Rabemanantsoa (born 1997), Malagasy footballer
