= Régis Gizavo =

- Born: June 16, 1959
- Origin: Tulear, Madagascar
- Died: July 16, 2017 (aged 58)
- Occupation: Accordionist
- Formerly of: Madagascar All Stars

Régis Gizavo (June 16, 1959 – July 16, 2017) was a Malagasy accordionist. He was born in Tulear, Madagascar and began playing the accordion at a young age. In 1990 he won the Radio France Internationale "Prix découvertes".

In addition to two solo albums, Régis Gizavo has been a member of the Corsican group I Muvrini, and contributed to a range of recordings, including albums by the Cape Verdean singers Cesária Évora and Lura. Gizavo partnered with Louis Mhlanga and David Mirandon to record Stories, 2006 winner of KAOS (FM)'s Spin The Globe award. He later partnered with four other musicians from Madagascar (Justin Vali, Fenoamby, Erick Manana, and Dama, leader of Mahaleo) to record an album together as the Madagascar All Stars. His voice and accordion playing was singled out for praise, "[adding] a level of depth to the percussive Salegy style that characterises a lot of Malagasy music".

== Death ==
Reports say that he died of heart failure with an accordion strapped to his chest during a performance.

Régis Gizavo "Zeombanao" (1995)
Malagasy accordion performance by Régis Gizavo

== Discography ==
- Mikea (Label Bleu/Indigo 1996)
- Samy Olombelo ([Label Bleu/Indigo 2000)
- Stories with Louis Mhlanga, David Mirandon (Marabi Productions 2006)
- Madagascar All Stars (Cinq Planètes 2009)
- Ilakake (Cinq Planètes 2012)
- Vincent Peirani, Stian Carstensen, Régis Gizavo, Klaus Paier : Jazz At Berlin Philharmonic IV - Accordion Night (ACT Music 2015)
- Laurinda Hofmeyr & Afrique Mon Désir Ensemble & Régis Gizavo : Afrique Mon Désir (2017)

== Filmography ==
- Songs for Madagascar (2017)
- Fahavalo, Madagascar 1947 (2010)
