= Tearano =

- Origin: Madagascar
- Genres: Beko, tsapiky

Tearano is a musical group from the southwestern region of Madagascar. They perform a contemporary form of the traditional beko genre, fusing southern vocal harmonies and tsapiky rhythms with modern instrumentation heavily featuring synthesizers and electric guitars. The band's innovative instrumentation modernized the tsapiky sound and rendered it more radio friendly and accessible to listeners in other regions of Madagascar. The band is considered an ambassador of the musical traditions of the south, and is credited with popularizing the tsapiky genre outside of the southern region of Toliara where it originated.

== See also ==
- Music of Madagascar
