= Oladad =

Hip-hop folk-fusion group from Madagascar

- Origin: Madagascar
- Genres: Dombe
- Years active: 1996–present
- Labels: Lemur Records
- Members: Dadalo; Evans; Kids; Tsiry; Lova

Oladad is a hip-hop folk-fusion group from Madagascar. They perform a fusion of hip-hop, dance and the traditional horija music of the Betsileo people, including such instruments as the kabosy, jejy, sodina and fiddle. The band was formed in 1996 in Fianarantsoa. The band draws its name from the reverse spelling of the name of lead member Dadalo, whose name signifies "luck" (vintana mahery adalo). Oladad comprises five singers (Dadalao, Evans, Kids, Tsiry and Lova) and six musicians.

From 1996 to 2001, Oladad was an early act on the nascent Malagasy hip-hop and rap scene. Beginning in 2002, the band originated a rhythm they termed "dombe" (from the Malagasy mandona be, "heavy strike"), merging hip-hop rhythms with horija Betsileo music. They released their first album in 2010, producing their first hit, "Sokafy ny fety (Afindrafindrao)", an adaptation of the traditional Merina tune "Afindrafindrao" infused with Betsileo instrumentation and hip-hop rhythm. The song could be heard in nightclubs, weddings and school parties across the country. After many years of performing across Madagascar, they performed their first concert in the capital of Antananarivo on 25 May 2010 to a sold-out crowd at the SK Melodie cabaret. They released a second album, Ketamanga, in 2012 to great success.

Oladad "Salamanga" (2010)
Malagasy group Oladad blends hip-hop and traditional Betsileo influences, including kabosy and horija.

The band seeks to appeal both to urban and rural populations of all ages by paying tribute to the Malagasy musical heritage while demonstrating its versatility in fusing it with contemporary sounds. An early musical influence was the French hip-hop group I AM. The band is more recently influenced by the Black Eyed Peas and such contemporary Malagasy bands as Njava, Baba and Sahalala. The band members have stated that they place value on both the vocal quality of these performers as well as the social messages in their songs. In addition, the band is inspired by older traditional artists like Jean Emilien and Rataomina. Soladad considers Rapraosy, a legendary Betsileo violinist and sodina player who was featured on their first album, to be their mentor and the "soul of Oladad". The band members also pay attention to their look, often blending Western hip-hop fashion and traditional lambas. The band's first tour overseas, planned for 2009 in Germany, was cancelled due to the political crisis in Madagascar that began the same year.

== See also ==
- Music of Madagascar
