= Mama Sana =

- Born: 1900; Madagascar
- Genres: Salegy
- Occupation(s): Singer, songwriter, musician
- Instrument(s): Valiha, voice
- Years active: 1915-1997

Mama Sana (1900–1997) was a Tandroy singer and performer of traditional airs on the valiha tube zither, the national instrument of Madagascar. She was a charismatic performer and dressed in traditional clothing with coins braided into her hair. Sana gained national and international acclaim over the course of her career, distinguished by her innovative reinvention of the valiha performance technique and her fusion of traditional Tandroy and Sakalava musical styles.

Mama Sana recorded several solo albums before her death in 1997. Her music was sampled by French electro-pop new age band Deep Forest for their third album, Comparsa. After her death, Sana's house was converted to a museum and a cultural association was founded in her honor to promote traditional music of the Sakalava and Tandroy people.

== Discography ==
Title	Released	Label	Tracks (Length)
The legendary Mama Sana	1992	Sanachie LC	12 (43'55")
Madagascar: Anthologie des voix. Enregistrements et texte: Victor Randrianary	1997	MCM/INEDIT	12 (43'55")
Madagascar Musique des Sakalava Menabe, Hommage à Mama Sana	2000	MCM/INEDIT	12 (43'55")

== See also ==
- Music of Madagascar
