= Mahaleo =

Malagasy folk-pop band

Background information
- Origin: Antsirabe, Madagascar
- Genres: Tsentsigat
- Years active: 13 May 1972–present
- Members: Dama (Zafimahaleo Rasolofondraosolo); Bekoto (Honoré August Rabekoto)
- Past members: Raoul (Raosolosolofo Razafindranoa); Nono (Andrianabelina Rakotobe); Fafah (Famantanantsoa Andriamihaingo Rajaonarison); Dadah (Andrianabela Rakotobe); Charle (Charle-Bert Andrianaivo)

Mahaleo is a folk-pop band from Madagascar that is widely viewed as the most popular Malagasy group of all time. The band was founded by Dama (Zafimahaleo Rasolofondraosolo) with six of his classmates after first performing together during the rotaka student protests at their high school on 13 May 1972. Mahaleo's lyrics draw upon the indirect language of traditional hainteny and ohabolana (Malagasy poetry and proverbs) to expose contemporary political and social issues and invite listeners to identify their own solutions.

Mahaleo performs a genre they pioneered, called tsentsigat, that draws from the acoustic folk and protest song genres as well as the diverse musical traditions of Madagascar. Each of the band members sings, and all but one also play acoustic guitar. In addition, the band makes use of traditional instruments like the kabosy guitar and sodina flute. While the band is acclaimed for its large catalog of hits, with over 300 songs composed since 1972, its members are also admired for their commitment to live the message of solidarity for national development that features in most of their music. Each band member has gone on to cultivate a primary career in addition to his participation in Mahaleo in areas ranging from medical care and sociology to farming and politics. The band has collectively launched two development initiatives, in addition to numerous other activities managed by individual members of the group.

Over forty years after its formation, the band continues to regularly attract large audiences to its live performances and enjoys popularity across three generations. Their music is considered emblematic of Malagasy identity. The band has toured frequently across Madagascar and internationally to countries including France, Canada and the United States. Mahaleo was the first Malagasy band to be invited to perform at the historic Olympia venue in Paris. The band has been the subject of two books and one feature-length documentary film. The oldest member of the group, Raoul, died in 2010. In 2014, the second oldest member Nono died. On 20 October 2019 Fafah died, followed by Dadah on 3 November that same year. Charle died in August 2021. Dama and Bekoto are left behind.

== History ==
=== Origins ===
Many of the band members grew up together: Dama, Dadah and Bekoto were playmates and attended the same primary school; during their secondary school studies, Dadah's older brother Nono likewise became a close friend of Raoul, the older brother of Dama. The high school offered a music program in which Dadah, Nono, Charle, Bekoto and Fafah participated together, with Fafah as a vocalist and Bekoto as a pianist. Beginning in 1970, Raoul became enamored with the acoustic guitar. He met frequently with Dadah and Nono to play together using guitars he constructed from wood and bicycle brake cables available at a workshop attached to a center for the deaf and blind where his father worked; the trio began performing at school parties and events. As teens, the trio often listened to a radio show hosted by popular Malagasy journalist and ethnomusicologist Latimer Rangers, who recorded, broadcast and promoted contemporary and traditional music from villages across Madagascar. Rangers also broadcast foreign artists who were relatively unknown to the Malagasy public, such as Bob Dylan, described the meaning and history of the protest song and other foreign genres, and drew connections between Malagasy musical styles and American Blues music, South African music and other genres.

A student and farmer protest movement, termed the rotaka, had been gaining momentum across the country since April 1971. These protests expressed popular rejection of the policies and repression of president Philibert Tsiranana's neo-colonial administration. On 24 April 1972, secondary school students in the capital of Antananarivo protested in solidarity with the city's medical university students to support revisions of the colonial era curriculum and the dismissal of teachers from France. Secondary school students in other major cities organized similar protests at their local high schools, and those with musical, poetic or theatrical talent spontaneously entertained their classmates at the gatherings. On the first day of the protests in Antsirabe, Dama and Raoul performed a song they called "Matoa 'Zahay Manao Girevy" ("Why We're on Strike") which Dama had composed shortly before. As they entertained protesters at their high school, they were joined by the other members of the group to compose and perform new songs with diverse themes ranging from politics to love. Dama and Dadah were the first to compose songs and perform them; Raoul was the next to begin composing songs for the protest, followed by Bekoto. The first song the group performed together, entitled "Ianao" ("You"), was written by Dama. Among the first songs the group performed together was a piece entitled "Aleloia" ("Halleluia"). The first song with a political theme was entitled "Tsindry Hazo Lena" ("The Oppressed") and was composed by Raoul, the oldest group member. In the protests' spirit of embracing the Malagasy identity, Dadah was the first group member to write song lyrics in Malagasy, a language that had been rejected as old-fashioned under the French; once the group joined, other members soon followed his example.

When a television reporter covering the students' strike in Antsirabe asked the boys to share the name of their group, they did not yet consider themselves a musical act and had not chosen a name. One of them spontaneously replied "Mahaleo". The name is most commonly translated as meaning "free" or "independent", but with nuance more precisely meaning "to have enough power to win/resist/endure/accomplish". In addition to being part of Dama's family name (Zafimahaleo), the word appealed to the group as the embodiment of their purpose to empower the disenfranchised masses and exalt Malagasy values and culture in the post-colonial era. Together they created and performed songs that affirmed the Malagasy identity and gave voice to the concerns of the rural communities and youth.

On 13 May, security forces shot student protesters in Antananarivo. Although Bekoto had initially been reluctant to take sides because he was a largely apolitical adolescent and dating the daughter of the Prime Minister, this event galvanized the group members and led to the intensification of student protests across the island. Within days, Tsiranana announced his resignation and a transitional government was put in place under General Gabriel Ramanantsoa. Dama participated in community meetings where potential policy reforms were developed. As the protest movement ended, the group traveled to Antananarivo to perform at an event in support of the transition organized on the University of Antananarivo campus. This was their first performance before a large audience and despite an inadequate sound system that prevented most audience members from hearing them, they enjoyed a strongly positive reception. Following this success, the group members returned to Antsirabe to complete their high school studies. Raoul and Nono completed the baccalaureat exam in 1973 and moved into the student dormitory in Antananarivo to continue their studies at the national university.

=== Early years ===
Hay Hay (Raoul/Mahaleo, 1979)
Mahaleo performing Hay Hay at the Olympia in 2007

The band's popularity continued to grow over the coming years. As the younger band members completed their high school studies, they performed frequent concerts in Antananarivo, staying overnight in the student dorms with Raoul and Nono. Fafah moved to Antananarivo shortly afterward to live with his parents, and the band often gathered at his family's home, where they composed many of their early songs. As each of the younger boys passed their baccalaureat, they moved to Antananarivo to continue their studies at the university, which they paid through a combination of state subsidies and the profits from their concerts. Political party representatives often approached band members to request them to become official supporters and party members, but the band preferred to remain politically independent. Another young and emerging group, Lolo sy ny Tariny, was recruited by the political party MFM, who attempted to pit the two groups against each other. Although there were occasional arguments between Bekoto and members of Lolo sy ny Tariny that garnered publicity, the band remained largely above political disputes.

Mahaleo recorded their first album in 1973 upon the invitation of Raklio, leader of the group Rahona. He had heard their single "Adin-tsaina" ("Troubles") and suggested the band record it at the Comarmond studio in the Antanimena neighborhood of Antananarivo; "Raosy Vony" ("Yellow Rose") was also recorded as the album's B-side. Latimer Rangers began playing "Adin-tsaina" on his radio show, and the band enjoyed their first major hit. The band was invited to perform live on Rangers' show, enabling listeners to discover a larger repertoire of the band's compositions. The national radio received hundreds of fan letters for the group, leading the national television station to invite Mahaleo to film a short set performance for national broadcast. The band recorded the first ever LP record by a Malagasy artist or band in 1976. Entitled Mahaleo Madagascar, the album was recorded live inside a record shop and was produced by popular singer Bessa. Shortly afterward, the national television channel RadioTelevision Malgache (RTM) shot a black and white film of the band over the course of fifteen days in Antsirabe. Although the film generated strong acclaim from RTM viewers, all copies of the original recording have been lost. When the band performed a concert organized by the Alliance Francaise of Antananarivo in 1977, the demand for tickets greatly exceeded capacity of the venue, prompting the group to play the same concert twice in one evening to enable all their waiting fans to enjoy the performance.

Tsiranana's ouster ushered in the socialist Second Republic under Admiral Didier Ratsiraka in 1975, but the ineffectiveness of the regime's philosophy soon fomented popular disillusionment. Persistent in their exposure of political problems like corruption and abuse of power under Ratsiraka, Mahaleo repeatedly saw their songs banned from the radio. The band successfully countered efforts at censorship by encouraging their fans to produce and distribute bootlegged recordings of their concerts. They continued to gain in popularity, regularly performing live shows across Madagascar and launching frequent tours to play for the Malagasy diaspora in major French population centers like Paris, Toulouse and Marseille.

=== Later years ===
Somambisamby (Raoul/Mahaleo, 1991)
Mahaleo performing Somambisamby in 2007

The backlash against the socialist Second Republic brought about the democratic Third Republic under consecutive presidents Albert Zafy (1991), Ratsiraka (1997) and Marc Ravalomanana (2001), followed by a Fourth Republic under Andry Rajoelina, who came to power in a 2009 coup d'état. Although Dama performed at political rallies in Paris during the eight-month political standoff following the 2001 presidential elections that brought Ravalomanana to power, Mahaleo as a full group has never sided with any particular politician, instead expressing through their lyrics the social and political views and concerns of the average Malagasy citizen. They tend to promote collective, grassroots action as the best solution to the country's problems, rather than entrusting the work to politicians and international development partners.

Committed to living the philosophy they sing about, the band members have each pursued careers apart from their lives as the superstars of Malagasy pop music. Most of the members of Mahaleo have also launched individual humanitarian projects, in addition to the cooperative they formed together in the 1980s to support the hand-made production of traditional musical instruments, and the Centre des informations de communication, d'animation, formation et d'éducation (CICAFE) rural development center they launched in 2000. As the years passed and the members of the band matured in their respective careers, they started to write songs more relevant to the difficult conditions of life of the Malagasy people and the underdeveloped state of the nation, addressing such topics as environmental conservation, poverty, education, and violence. Among their hits in this period are songs that address rural-urban flight, homesickness after moving abroad to find work, husbands who abandon their families, and the guilt of military personnel required to carry out repression against their compatriots.

The group has toured extensively in Madagascar, performing hundreds of concerts. The Malagasy diaspora often invites Mahaleo to perform concerts outside of the country, most frequently in France, but also throughout Europe, the United States, Canada and elsewhere. The band continues to draw crowds to their shows, regularly attracting tens of thousands of spectators. To celebrate the 35th anniversary of the band, on 2 and 3 June 2007 Mahaleo performed two sold-out shows at the historic Olympia venue in Paris. Mahaleo was the first Malagasy group invited to perform at the Olympia, an honor later extended to compatriots Jaojoby in 2008 and Erick Manana in 2013. Travel agencies in Antananarivo promoted "Mahaleo packages" designed to enable fans in Madagascar to easily plan a trip to Paris to see the group perform at this prestigious French venue. The 2008 album of this performance, 35ème anniversaire : Live Mahaleo à l'Olympia, was the highest-selling album in Madagascar that year at nearly 10,000 copies sold; the second-highest-selling album that year was Foiko manontolo, the first solo release by Mahaleo band member Fafa.

== Style ==
Mahaleo plays tsentsigat, a form of modernized Malagasy folk music pioneered by the band. Their sound is inspired by the American protest song genre and western folk music. Spin described the band as "Madagascar's Bob Dylan". The members of Mahaleo were also deeply inspired by the broad and diverse musical traditions of Madagascar. Most evident is the influence of the ba gasy Malagasy guitar with a vocal accompaniment style that emerged in the highlands of Madagascar in the early 20th century. Their sound also reflects elements of beko polyharmony from the south, the polyrhythmic sound of jijy, the tandonaka rhythm of the mountains, and the sigaoma, which blends salegy music of the northwestern coast and the related sega genre of nearby Réunion.

Each member of the band specializes in one or more musical instruments. Dama (Zafimahaleo Rasolofondraosolo) plays acoustic guitar, harmonica and the indigenous kabosy; Bekoto (Honoré August Rabekoto) plays guitar, piano, harmonica and the traditional sodina flute; and Raoul (Raosolosolofo Razafindranoa) played guitar and violin. Members Fafah (Famantanantsoa Andriamihaingo Rajaonarison) and Dadah (Andrianabelina Rakotobe) also played guitar and sang; Nono (Andrianabela Rakotobe) played bass, acoustic guitar and sang a little bit. Charle (Charle-Bert Andrianaivo), the only member of the group who does not play guitar, provides vocals and percussion. While all members of the band provide vocal harmonies and solos, Fafa is the member most often featured as a solo singer.

The band members are described by an Afrisson reviewer as "intellectual", and their lyrics are often politically charged and advocate for rebuilding the country and Malagasy society and culture. The lyrics of Mahaleo's earlier songs in particular promoted the values of Marxism, reflecting the popularity of socialist philosophies as the best alternative to neocolonialism in Africa and other regions freeing themselves from the control of Europe; the group also commonly explored the themes of conflict, the political demands of the people, love, friendship and death. According to music producer Hannes Lämmler, "These simple themes moved the Malagasy people, because they express the deepest aspirations of a people in search of an identity ... with [Mahaleo], the truth was affirmed that it is possible to be Malagasy and proud of it." Over time, the themes explored in the songs of Mahaleo expanded to include social problems like criminality, environmental destruction and other contemporary social and political issues. Nearly all their songs reflect the ancestral value of fihavanana (kinship, solidarity) that forms the foundation of traditional Malagasy society. Unlike most bands, Mahaleo avoids prescribing particular solutions to each problem they address, preferring to draw upon the local traditions of hainteny and ohabolana (Malagasy poetry and proverbs) in order to inspire their listeners to reflect and draw their own conclusions.

== Legacy ==
This is a country where peasants are constantly seeking a way out of their miasma and city dwellers want to escape the stressful labyrinth of urban life, and where youth move too quickly from childhood to adolescence, past to modernity, and poverty to death. Mahaleo's songs recount this state of affairs, this state of living. Themes about the masses, both simple and poetic, but always socially engaged, form the heart of their music. Among Malagasy musicians, they are the group that is closest to the people, from north to south and east to west.

— Film Fest Amiens (2007)

Mahaleo is generally considered Madagascar's most popular musical group of all time. The band has composed over 300 songs since its formation over forty years ago. Mahaleo was the first Malagasy act to write music in the folk pop genre, and innovated on the genre by incorporating elements of the island's diverse musical traditions. An RFI journalist described them as "an emblematic group whose popularity transcends the epochs," and they were promoted at the Olympia music hall as the "leader of Malagasy music ... whose appeal crosses three generations."

According to a reviewer at California Newsreel, "Few musical groups have expressed so eloquently or consistently the aspirations of their people as the Malagasy septet Mahaleo." The reviewer attributes the resonance of their messages to the band members' pursuit of careers outside of music that enable them to contribute to national development and keep them engaged in the daily concerns of their average compatriot, observing "The repeated hopes and disappointments of the post-independence period have generated the island's modern myths, the songs of Mahaleo." A Radio France Internationale journalist asserts, "In the highlands of Madagascar, building a bonfire without playing or singing Mahaleo seems quite simply inconceivable, so strongly has this group's musical repertoire taken hold in Malagasy people's hearts."

In 2005, the group took part in a movie, Mahaleo, that describes its own history and provides a contemporary view of Madagascar. The 102-minute Malagasy and French language film was directed by Marie-Clémence Paes and Raymond Rajaonarivelo with support from producers in Belgium, France and Madagascar. The film depicts daily life in Madagascar and for each of the band's members, as well as live performances of the band's greatest hits. A live concert DVD produced by Laterit Productions and released in 2007 compiles highlights from the band's 35th anniversary performances at the Olympia theater in Paris; the disc features the subtitled transcription of each song's lyrics in Malagasy, French and English. The band has also been the subject of two books. The first, La Saga Mahaleo, is a detailed history of the band and its members written in 2007 by Randy Donny. The second, entitled Mahaleo, 40 ans d'histoire(s) de Madagascar, was authored by Fanny Pigeaud in 2010; it explores Madagascar's history since independence through interviews with the band members, who recount their own experiences and ways that current events influenced their music.

== Band members ==
Dama was born 26 May 1954 in Marolambo, near Toamasina. He earned a university degree in sociology and has served as a Deputy in the National Assembly. During his first term he represented Antananarivo, later moving to the rural district of Ambatofinandrahana where he was elected for a second term. Dama operates and hosts a local radio station, which serves as one of several fora for his efforts to educate the public on HIV/AIDS and good practice in the agriculture sector and in water management. Dama drew his musical influences from his father, who played guitar and sang the traditional songs of the Malagasy highlands, as well as his mother, who enjoyed writing short stories and articles about daily life in Madagascar. His father also frequently told stories of the 1947 Malagasy uprising, during which time he had been forced to flee and hide in the woods for a six-month period; these stories developed in Dama and Raoul a skepticism toward politicians. Although raised a Catholic, as a child he sang in the local Protestant choir. He began composing lyrics at the age of eleven in French, but soon afterward was drawn to the "musicality" of the Malagasy language and wrote pieces in his mother tongue.

Dadah, born 21 June 1954 in Antsirabe, worked as a neurosurgeon. His choice of career was driven by the death of his father from cancer when he was a child. Dadah's first child happened to be a son and was born during his studies at the University of Antananarivo. After studying for ten years in France, Dadah returned to provide medical care at a hospital in Antsirabe, where he also campaigned against corruption in the medical system.

Unlike his fellow band members, Fafah – born 13 May 1954 in Ampasamadinika, a neighborhood of Antananarivo – has based his career entirely around singing. He was raised in a musical family: his father played mandolin and his mother enjoyed singing. Fafah began playing guitar at the age of nine and sang along with popular European and American artists on the radio, including Harry Belafonte, Claude François and Mike Brant. Fafah discontinued his studies after the 1972 rotaka and returned with his wife and son (born in 1973) to live with his parents in Antananarivo. There he obtained a position at the Ministry of Transportation, becoming the first salaried member of the group. For the first three decades of his career, Fafah often recorded and performed in collaboration with other artists such as singer-songwriter Erick Manana and the iconic sodina master Rakoto Frah in the group Feo-Gasy. He released his first solo album in 2003 to strong sales across Madagascar. In the late 1990s Fafah led a successful campaign to increase access to public latrines in the impoverished Antananarivo neighborhood of Isotry.

Percussionist Charle was born on 2 May 1954 in Tolongoina, near Fianarantsoa. He studied sociology at the University of Antananarivo. Charle tends to guard his private life and remains out of the public eye when not performing with the band. Charle has been an advocate for the poorest neighborhoods in Antananarivo and in nearby rural areas, and established the CICAFE association to improve living conditions there.

A native of Antsirabe, Nono was born on 21 September 1952. He completed his studies in surgical medicine in Switzerland on a scholarship from the Helvetic Confederation before returning to work as a surgeon in the university hospital in Antananarivo. He died of cancer on 29 August 2014.

Like Dama, Bekoto was trained as a sociologist. He was born on 8 February 1953 in Antsirabe, where he continues to reside. There he has established a community radio station and leads a committee within the IREDEC association that campaigns for the rights of the rural populace. A self-declared "extremist", Bekoto became a passionate advocate for socialist principles and social revolution as expressed in Ratsiraka's Boky Mena manifesto during his years at the university. As a child, he learned classical piano technique from his grandfather and practiced on a piano his family owned; he taught himself to play the Malagasy flute later in life.

On 3 September 2010, the oldest member of the group, Raosolosolofo Razafindranoa, better known as Raoul died at the age of 59 in Toamasina, where he lived most of his life. In addition to performing with the band, Raoul worked as a primary care doctor, having completed his training in social medicine in Romania, where he lived and studied from 1974 to 1980 on a university scholarship. Beyond his medical work in Toamasina, he also farmed, taught music and crafted hand-made guitars.

== Discography ==
Title	Released	Label
35ème anniversaire : Live Mahaleo à l'Olympia	2008	Laterit Productions
Fitia	2007	Media Consulting
Mama sera	2007	Kanto Records
Tanindrazana	2007	Media Consulting
Mahaleo – bande originale du film	2005	Laterit Productions
Velo	2001	Mars
Mahaleo en concert	1998	Mélodie
Tadidiko	1997	Cod-Music AG - Pro Euro Mad
Madagascar	1995	Mélodie
Concert '95	1995	WDR
Mahaleo en concert	1991	WDR
Ralita	1991	WDR
Mahaleo en concert	1983	Pro Euro Mad - WDR
Marovoay	1979	Discomad
Hitovy anjara: Raha sendra mandalo	1979	Discomad
Fanambadiana tsa mba kilalao: Imbola	1979	Discomad
Madagascar	1976	Playasound
Ravorondreo	1972	Discomad

== See also ==
- Music of Madagascar
