= Lego (musician) =

- Born: 1973; Madagascar
- Occupation(s): Singer, songwriter
- Instrument(s): Accordion, voice
- Years active: 1997-present

Lego is a Sakalava musician who performs accordion music in the traditional style of the coastal regions of Madagascar. In addition to his acclaim as a musician, Lego is also known for having lost his sight as a child, and for being the half-brother of Malagasy superstar Rossy. Lego has released numerous albums and has toured regularly on the international world music circuit.

== See also ==
- Music of Madagascar
