= Mika sy Davis =

Folk-fusion group from Madagascar

- Origin: Madagascar
- Genres: Basesa
- Years active: 2006–present
- Members: Mika; Franklin Davis

Mika sy Davis is a folk-fusion group from Madagascar composed of two male singer-songwriters named Mika and Franklin Davis. They perform a contemporary form of the traditional basesa genre of the island's east coast, blended with rock, soul and reggae. The band has been credited with revitalizing and nationally popularizing the basesa genre.

In 2005 the young duo was discovered by producer Fanja Andriamanantena, who featured them on a compilation album and continues to frequently write the lyrics to their songs. Their popularity slowly grew among urban Malagasy youth, increasing with the release of each of three albums: Ravoravo (2006), Amiako Anao (2008), and Ho et Aiza (2012). Mika sy Davis toured France in late 2012. Following several months spent restylizing their image under the guidance of Malagasy superstar Silo, the duo gave an acoustic performance in Antananarivo in February 2013 that was recorded live to produce their fourth album.

== See also ==
- Music of Madagascar
