= Poopy =

Malagasy pop singer

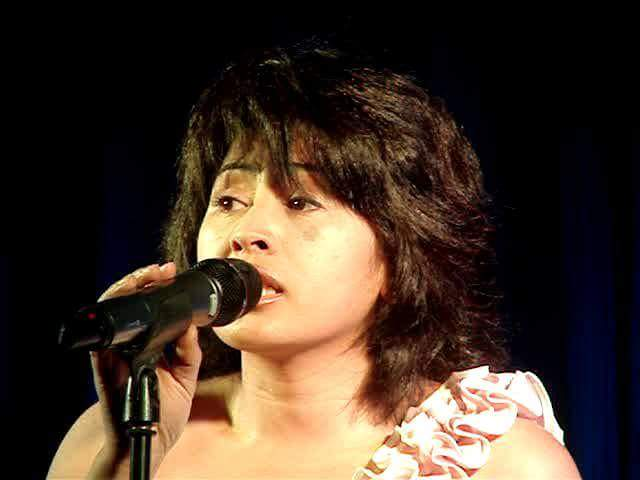
- Poopy in 2016

Background information
- Born: Josée Helihanta Ramahavalisoa; Madagascar
- Genre: Pop music
- Occupations: Singer; songwriter
- Instrument: Voice
- Years active: 1983–present

Josée Helihanta Ramahavalisoa, better known by her stage name Poopy, is a Malagasy pop singer who began singing in 1983. Lonely Planet has declared Poopy a "national treasure". She has been active in educating young mothers about breastfeeding their infants as a "nutrition ambassador" for UNICEF. Her nickname "Poopy" derives from a nickname given to a little cousin of hers who her family members say she resembled.

== See also ==
- Music of Madagascar
