= Taralila =

Malagasy musical instrument

The taralila is a type of hexagonal concertina played in Malagasy music.

== Sources ==
- Fuhr, Jenny. Experiencing Rhythm: Contemporary Malagasy Music and Identity. United Kingdom: Cambridge Scholars Publishing, 2013. ISBN 9781443864312
- Pandey, Ashish. Encyclopaedic Dictionary of Music. Volume 2. India: Isha Books, 2005. ISBN 9788182052925
- The Spirit's Dance in Africa: Evolution, Transformation, and Continuity in Sub-Sahara. United States: Galerie Amrad African Arts Publications, 1997. p. 338. ISBN 9781896371016
- Edkvist, Ingela. The performance of tradition: an ethnography of Hira Gasy popular theatre in Madagascar. Seychelles: Department of Cultural Anthropology and Ethnology, 1997. p. 119. ISBN 9789155440701
