= Senge =

- Born: Madagascar
- Genres: Beko
- Instrument: Voice

Senge is an a capella vocal group from southern Madagascar. The group was formed as a male trio that performed the beko polyharmonic style of the Tandroy people, occasionally accompanied by an eight-piece acoustic band featuring traditional instruments, rhythms and harmonies.

The group's leader, Sengemanana, for whom the group was named, initially became famous as the bass vocalist lead singer of the a capella trio Salala. As part of Salala, Senge toured domestically and internationally. The two other members of the group are Yvon Mamisolofo and Jean Ramanambint. In 1999, the band won the Discovery Prize awarded by Radio France International, propelling them to international celebrity and regular touring on the international music festival circuit. They have recorded albums internationally and domestically for over twenty years. In 2000, Sengemanana died of cancer; Mamisolofo and Ramanambint continue recording and performing together, promoting the Tandroy culture on the international and domestic stage.

== See also ==
- Music of Madagascar
