= Andrianary Ratianarivo =

- Born: 1895; Madagascar
- Genres: Kalon'ny fahiny, ba-gasy, vakondrazana
- Occupation(s): Pianist, composer
- Instrument(s): Piano, acoustic guitar

Andrianary Ratianarivo (1895-1949) was a pianist and composer of kalon'ny fahiny, vakondrazana and ba-gasy music from the central highlands of Madagascar. He was a major composer for the Malagasy theatrical genre that reached its peak between 1920 and 1940 at the Theatre d'Isotry in Antananarivo. Ratianarivo was born in the year of Madagascar's colonization to a musician of the royal palace. His pieces were typically written for piano, often with solo, duet or choral vocal accompaniment sung in the Malagasy language. He was classically trained as a conductor and composed over 500 songs and scores for theater, including an opera penned by Jean-Joseph Rabearivelo entitled Imaitsoanala (1935), which remains the only Malagasy opera. In 1929 he formed "Troupe Jeanette" in Antananarivo with musicians Rakaramanga and Jeanette; this group, with new artists, continues to perform at the Theatre d'Isotry to the present. His songs form part of the canon of classical Malagasy piano music. A street in downtown Antananarivo is named after him.

Andrianary Ratianarivo "Azafady Ramatoa" (1929)
Theatrical Malagasy piano style was based on valiha technique.

== See also ==
- Music of Madagascar
