= Jerry Marcoss =

- Born: 1980 (age 44–45); Antalaha, Madagascar
- Genres: Kawitry, mangaliba, salegy
- Occupation(s): Singer, songwriter
- Instrument: Voice
- Years active: 2001-present

Jerry Marcoss is a singer and composer of kawitry, mangaliba and salegy music of Madagascar. Born in Antalaha in 1980, Jerry Marcoss is responsible for the national popularization of the kawitry genre of the northeast coast and has been termed the "King of Kawitry" by the Malagasy press. Since launching his musical career in 2001, Marcoss has released five albums and regularly gives performances across Madagascar, as well as in Europe and throughout the region. He is a high-energy performer and is distinguished by his positive lyrics, which are notably more universally comprehensible than many of his peers who sing in the northeastern coastal dialect of the Malagasy language. In 2006, he won the national award for Artiste Mafana de l'Annee ("Hottest Artist of the Year"). He has received several awards at annual musical competitions hosted by Radio France International, and has frequently collaborated with other popular Malagasy artists.

In 2011, Marcoss recorded a song in support of Andry Rajoelina, President of the High Transitional Authority, who has played it at numerous official events to attract crowds. Rajoelina came to power unconstitutionally as a result of the political crisis of 2009. In 2012, Marcoss participated in a campaign funded by the U.S. Department of State in Madagascar to promote conservation and green tourism in Ranomafana National Park, releasing a statement to encourage domestic tourism and filming a music video in the park.

== See also ==
- Music of Madagascar
