= Justin Vali =

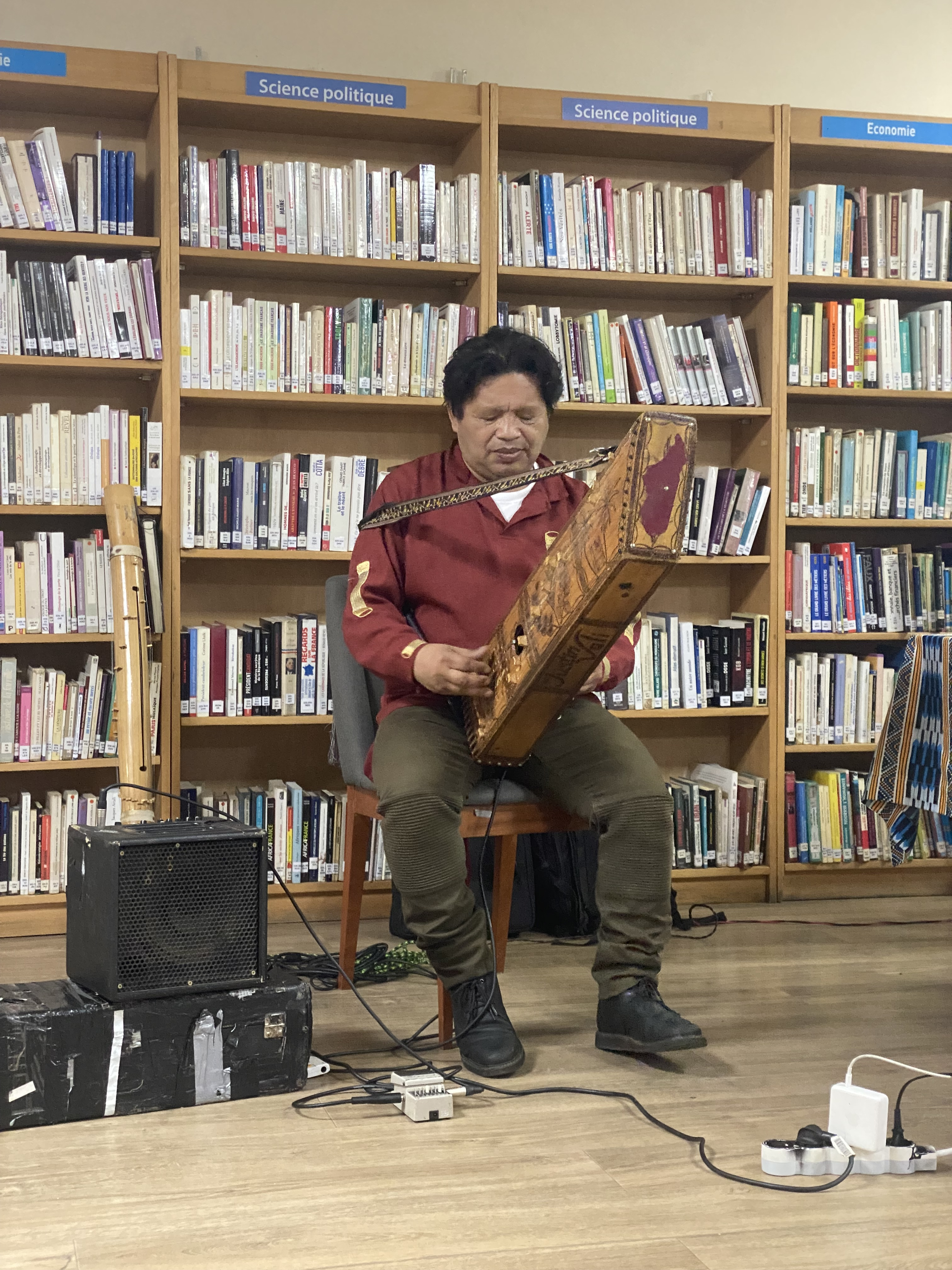
- Justin Vali in 2023

Background information
- Born: Justin Rakotondrasoa; Madagascar
- Genres: Vakondrazana
- Occupations: Singer, songwriter
- Instruments: Valiha, voice
- Years active: 1990-present
- Member of: Justin Vali Trio, Malagasy All Stars

Justin Vali ranks among the greatest living players of traditional Malagasy music on the valiha, a bamboo tube zither considered the national instrument of Madagascar. He also performs on the marovany box zither of central and southern Madagascar. Vali contributed to several compilations in the late 1980s before beginning to release his own albums in 1990. In 1994 he recorded Ny Marina (The Truth) at Real World Studios under Peter Gabriel's Real World Records. In 1999 he released The Sunshine Within, a collaboration with Paddy Bush. In 2008 he collaborated with Erick Manana and other prominent Malagasy artists to record an album as the Malagasy All Stars. Vali resides in Paris and performs regularly on the international world music festival circuit, including performances on several continents with the WOMAD festival. In 2006 he was awarded the Grand Prize for Traditional Music by Société des Auteurs Compositeurs et Editeurs de Musique, the French songwriters' guild.

== See also ==
- Music of Madagascar
