= Mily Clément =

Mily Clement
- Born: Madagascar
- Genres: Salegy
- Occupation(s): Singer, songwriter
- Instrument(s): Percussion, voice

Mily Clement is one of the originators of the contemporary form of salegy, a traditional musical style of the northern coastal areas of Madagascar. He grew up surrounded by the music of the tromba spirit possession ceremonies in his community, and in his teens he became influenced by American and African guitarists, inspiring him to begin playing guitar. He began professionally performing guitar with local bands in Ambilobe.

In 1988 he became a percussionist in the band of his contemporary, Jaojoby, who had just begun to achieve nationwide acclaim. Jaojoby encouraged Clement to compose his own music. He was consequently invited in 1990 to provide music at the opening and closing ceremonies of the Island Games, attaining nationwide celebrity with the single "Tsy moramora mitady vola". The following year he performed on Afrovision. Stardom came when the International Conservation Organization selected his song, "Mandrora Mantsilany", to raise awareness of deforestation and conservation issues on the island. Clement has not recorded albums internationally or become a frequent performer on the international festival circuit, but enjoys strong popularity in Madagascar as a classic artist of the salegy genre.

== See also ==
- Music of Madagascar
