= Music of Madagascar =

Music, music genres and instruments of Masagascar

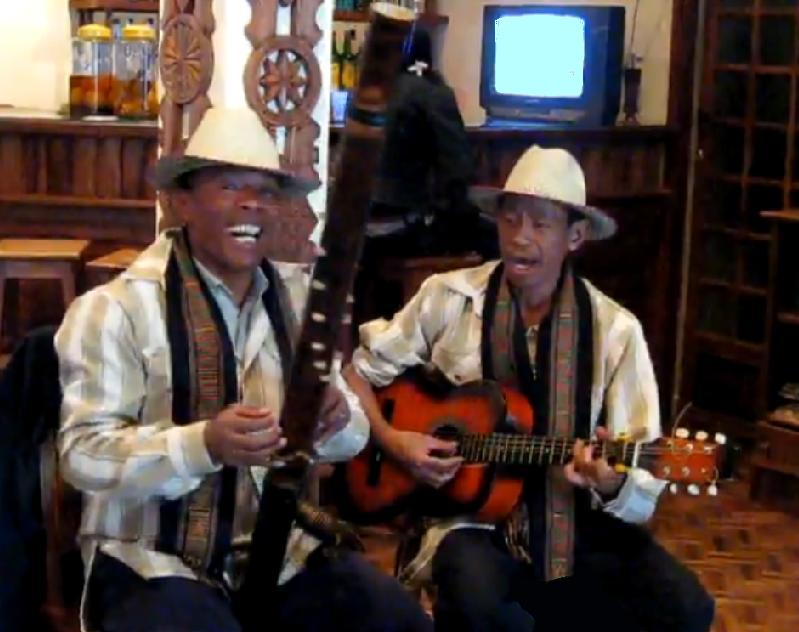
Malagasy musicians playing valiha and acoustic guitar

The highly diverse and distinctive music of Madagascar has been shaped by the musical traditions of Southeast Asia, Africa, Oceania, Arabia, Portugal, England, France and the United States over time as indigenous people, immigrants, and colonists have made the island their home. Traditional instruments reflect these widespread origins: the mandoliny and kabosy owe their existence to the introduction of the guitar by early Arab or European seafarers, the ubiquitous djembe originated in mainland Africa and the valiha—the bamboo tube zither considered the national instrument of Madagascar—directly evolved from an earlier form of zither carried with the first Austronesian settlers on their outrigger canoes.

Malagasy music can be roughly divided into three categories: traditional, contemporary and popular music. Traditional musical styles vary by region and reflect local ethnographic history. For instance, in the Highlands, the valiha and more subdued vocal styles are emblematic of the Merina, the predominantly Austronesian ethnic group that has inhabited the area since at least the 15th century, whereas among the southern Bara people, who trace their ancestry back to the African mainland, their a cappella vocal traditions bear close resemblance to the polyharmonic singing style common to South Africa. Foreign instruments such as the acoustic guitar and piano have been adapted locally to create uniquely Malagasy forms of music. Contemporary Malagasy musical styles such as the salegy or tsapika have evolved from traditional styles modernized by the incorporation of electric guitar, bass, drums and synthesizer. Many Western styles of popular music, including rock, gospel, jazz, reggae, hip-hop and folk rock, have also gained in popularity in Madagascar over the later half of the 20th century.

Music in Madagascar has served a variety of sacred and secular functions. In addition to its performance for entertainment or personal creative expression, music has played a key part in spiritual ceremonies, cultural events and historic and contemporary political functions. By the late 19th century, certain instruments and types of music became primarily associated with specific castes or ethnic groups, although these divisions have always been fluid and are continually evolving.

== Traditional music ==
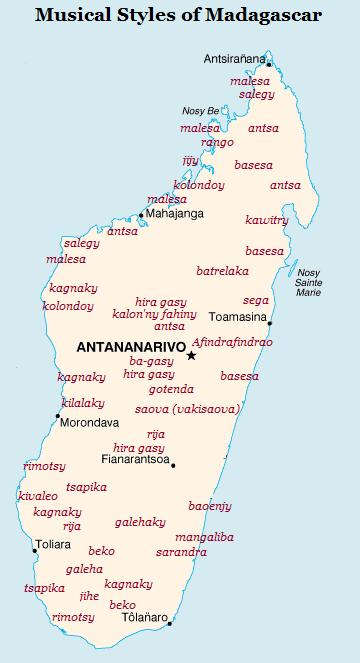
Distribution of Malagasy musical forms

Malagasy music is highly melodic and distinguishes itself from many traditions of mainland Africa by the predominance of chordophone relative to percussion instruments. Musical instruments and vocal styles found in Madagascar represent a blend of widespread commonalities and highly localized traditions. A common vocal style among the Merina and Betsileo of the Highlands, for instance, does not preclude differences in the prevalence of particular instrument types (the valiha among the Merina, and the marovany and kabosy among the Betsileo). Similarly, the practice of tromba (entering a trance state, typically induced by music) is present on both the western and eastern coasts of the island but the vocal styles or instruments used in the ceremony will vary regionally. Music in Madagascar tends toward major keys and diatonic scales, although coastal music makes frequent use of minor keys, most likely due to early Arab influences at coastal ports of call. Malagasy music has served a wide range of social, spiritual and mundane functions across the centuries.

=== Vocal traditions ===
Vocal traditions in Madagascar are most often polyharmonic; southern vocal styles bear strong resemblance to South African singing (as exemplified by groups such as Salala or Senge), whereas Highland harmonies, strongly influenced in the past two hundred years by European church music, are more reminiscent of Hawaiian or other Polynesian vocal traditions. Numerous amateur choirs performing Malagasy and Western music can be found in the capital region; the ensemble iCanto is a notable example of a professional choir, with concerts broadcast on national television. In the Highlands, and particularly in the 19th century, vocal performance by large groups called antsa was favored, while in the south and western coastal regions singing was performed with more elaborate ornamentation and in small groups.

Musical performance in Madagascar has often been associated with spiritual functions. Music is a key component in achieving a trance state in tromba (or bilo) spiritual rituals practiced in several regions of the island, as it is believed that each spirit has a different preferred piece of music. The association between music and ancestors is so strong on the eastern coast that some musicians will put rum, cigarettes or other valued objects inside an instrument (through the tone hole, for instance) as an offering to the spirits to receive their blessings. Similarly, music has long been central to the famadihana ceremony (periodic reburial of ancestors' shroud-wrapped mortal remains).

=== Musical instruments ===
Madagascar: Early 20th century distribution of musical instruments with African, Indonesian or European origins

Instruments in Madagascar were brought to the island by successive waves of settlers from across the Old World. Over 1500 years ago, the earliest settlers from Indonesia brought the oldest and most emblematic instruments, including the tube zither (valiha) which evolved into a box form (marovany) distinct to the island. Later settlers from the Arabian peninsula and the eastern coast of Africa contributed early lutes, whistles and other instruments that were incorporated into local musical traditions by the mid-16th century. The influence of instruments and musical styles from France and Great Britain began to have a significant impact on music in Madagascar by the 19th century.

==== Chordophones ====
The most emblematic instrument of Madagascar, the valiha, is a bamboo tube zither very similar in form to those used traditionally in Indonesia and the Philippines. The valiha is considered the national instrument of Madagascar. It is typically tuned to a diatonic mode to produce complex music based on harmonic, parallel thirds accompanied by a melodic bass line. The strings are traditionally cut and raised from the fibrous surface of the bamboo tube itself, although a contemporary form also exists that instead uses bicycle brake cables for strings to give the instrument a punchier sound.

Iny Hono Izy Ravorona ("Take Him/Her With You, O Bird") (traditional lullaby)
The strings of the ancestral valiha are made from the raised fibers of the bamboo tube resonator itself.

Diavolana ("Moonlight") (traditional folk song)
The steel-string valiha has grown in popularity over the past century.

Strings may be plucked with the fingernails, which are allowed to grow longer for this purpose. The instrument was originally used for rituals and for creative artistic expression alike. However, beginning in the mid-19th century, playing the instrument became the prerogative of the Merina aristocracy to such an extent that possessing long fingernails became symbolic of nobility. While the tubular valiha is the most emblematic form of the instrument most likely due to its popularization by the 19th century Merina aristocracy, other forms of the instrument exist across the island. In the region around the eastern port city of Toamasina, for instance, valiha used in tromba ceremonies may take a rectangular box form called marovany. While some regions construct their marovany from wood, near Toamasina the box is constructed of metal sheeting with much thicker and heavier strings that produce a different sound from the bamboo and bicycle cable valiha of the Highlands.

The kabosy (or kabosa) is a four to six-stringed simple guitar common in the southern Highlands moving toward the east, particularly among the Betsimisaraka and Betsileo ethnic groups. The soundbox, which is typically square or rectangular today, was originally circular in form, first made from a tortoise shell and later from wood carved into a rounded shape. Mandolina and gitara are the Antandroy names of a popular Southern chordophone similar to the kabosy but with nylon fishing line for strings and five or seven movable frets that facilitate modification of the instrument's tuning.

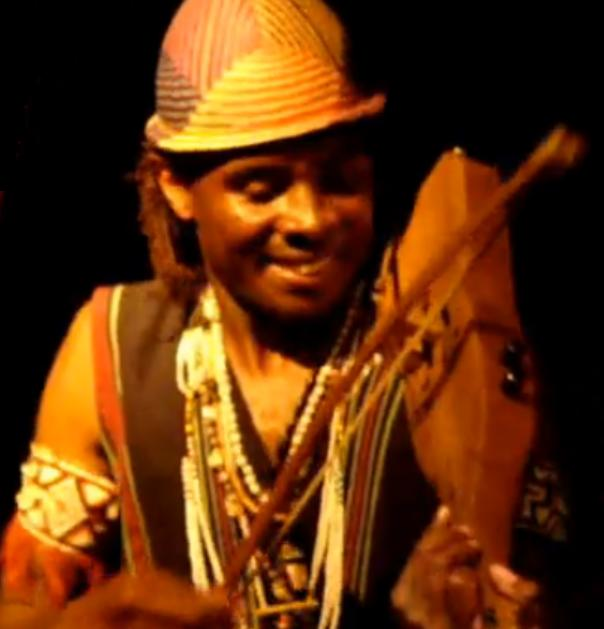
The lokanga played by a member of the group Vilon'androy

The jejy voatavo is a chordophone that traditionally has two sisal strings, three frets and a calabash resonator, although modern versions may have as many as eleven or thirteen strings, typically made of steel. A maximum of four of these are strung over the frets, while the rest are strung lengthwise down the sides of the neck and are strummed with the fingers in accompaniment to the primary melody which is played with a bow. This more elaborate jejy voatavo is especially popular among the Betsileo of the southern Highlands and the Betsimisaraka of the southeast, who play it in accompaniment to their sung epic poems, called rija. In 19th-century Highlands society under the Kingdom of Imerina, the jejy voatavo was considered to be a slave instrument which only mature men were permitted to play. The lokanga, an evolved jejy with the sound box carved to resemble a three-stringed fiddle, is popular among the Southern Antandroy and Bara ethnic groups. The simplest form of instrument in this family is the jejy lava (musical bow), believed to have been brought to Madagascar by settlers from mainland Africa.

Vilon'androy "Tolombolagne" (2005)
The lokanga is commonly heard in traditional Antandroy music of southern Madagascar.

Andrianary Ratianarivo "Azafady Ramatoa" (1929)
Theatrical Malagasy piano style was based on valiha technique.

D'Gary & Jihe "Lagnana" (1995)
The valiha and marovany inspired Malagasy guitarist D'Gary.

The piano was introduced to the royal Merina court in the early 19th century by envoys of the London Missionary Society, and soon afterward, local musicians began creating their own compositions for piano based on valiha technique. Piano compositions reached their peak with the Kalon'ny Fahiny style in the 1920s and 1930s before declining in the 1940s. Today, the compositions of this period by pianist theatrical composers like Andrianary Ratianarivo (1895–1949) and Naka Rabemananatsoa (1892–1952) form part of the canon of classical Malagasy music and feature in the repertoire of Malagasy students of piano.

When the modern acoustic guitar was first popularized in Madagascar, it was adopted by the lower classes who were inspired by the Kalon'ny Fahiny piano style but for whom the purchase of a costly piano was out of reach. Early guitarists adapted the piano style (itself based on valiha style) to this novel stringed instrument to create a genre that came to be known as ba-gasy. Soon afterward, the guitar was widely disseminated throughout the island, producing an explosion of regionally distinctive Malagasy guitar styles inspired by the music played on local traditional instruments. Finger picking is the favored technique and guitarists frequently experiment with original tunings to obtain the desired range. One of the most common tunings drops the sixth string from E to C and the fifth string from A to G, thereby enabling the guitarist to capture a range approximating that of a vocal choir. The Malagasy acoustic guitar style has been internationally promoted by such artists as Erick Manana and pioneering Bara artist Ernest Randrianasolo (better known by his stage name D'Gary), who blends the rhythms of tsapiky with innovative open tunings to approximate the sounds of the lokanga, valiha and marovany.

==== Aerophones ====
The sodina, an end-blown flute, is believed to be one of the oldest instruments on the island. There exists the more common and well-known short sodina, about a foot long with six finger holes and one for the thumb, and another similar end-blown flute over two feet long with three holes at the far end. Both are open-ended and are played by blowing diagonally across the near opening. The master of sodina performance, Rakoto Frah, was featured on the 1000 Malagasy franc (200 ariary) banknote after independence in 1960 and his death on 29 September 2001 prompted national mourning.

Feo-Gasy "Rakoto Frah" (1996)
Sodina performance by Rakoto Frah in a song dedicated to him by group Feo-Gasy

Régis Gizavo "Zeombanao" (1995)
Malagasy accordion performance by Régis Gizavo

The conch shell (antsiva or angaroa) is a similarly ancient instrument believed to have been brought over by early Indonesian settlers. Mainly played by men, it features a lateral blow hole in the Polynesian style and is typically reserved for ritual or spiritual uses rather than to create music for entertainment. The antsiva has also been recorded to have been used as part of Merina royal regalia. The fipple flute is a simple aerophone brought to Madagascar after 1000 CE by immigrants from Africa.

The two-octave diatonic accordion (gorodo), popular across Madagascar, is believed to have been imported by French colonists after 1896. In the 20th century, the instrument was commonly performed during tromba spirit possession ceremonies in a style called renitra. In the 1970s, the renitra was incorporated for the performance of electrified salegy music. This accordion style was also integrated into the performance of tsapika, while also inspiring the style used by the guitarists in these bands. Although today the sound of the accordion is most often replicated by a synthesizer in salegy or tsapika bands due to the expense and rarity of the instrument, accordions continue to hold a privileged place in the performance of tromba ceremonial music. Artists like half-brothers Lego and Rossy have gained success as accordion players. Régis Gizavo brought the contemporary style of renitra to the world music scene, winning several international awards for his accordion performance.

A variety of European aerophones were introduced in the 19th century under the Merina monarchy. These most notably include bugles (bingona) and clarinets (mainty kely), and less frequently the trombone or oboe (anjomara). Their use today is largely restricted to the Highlands and the hira gasy or mpilalao bands that perform at famadihana (reburials), circumcisions and other traditional celebrations. Metal and wood harmonicas are also played.

==== Membranophones ====
Various types of membranophones, traditionally associated with solemn occasions, are found throughout the island. In the Highlands, European bass drums (ampongabe) and snare drums introduced in the 19th century have replaced an earlier drum (ampongan’ny ntaolo) traditionally beat to accentuate the discourse of a mpikabary speaker during a hira gasy or other formal occasions where the oratory art of kabary is practiced. Only men can play the ampongabe, while women and men may both play the smaller langoroana drum. The hazolahy ("male wood") drum produces the deepest sound and is reserved for the most significant occasions such as famadihana, circumcision ceremonies and the ancient festival of the royal bath.

==== Idiophones ====
Bamboo shakers (kaiamba) filled with seeds are integral to the performance of tromba on the eastern coast of the island, although modern items such as empty insecticide tins or sweetened condensed milk cans filled with pebbles increasingly take the place of traditional bamboo. Shakers of this sort are used throughout Madagascar, commonly in conjunction with tromba and other ceremonies. During the slave trade era, another idiophone—a scraper called the tsikadraha—was popularized in Madagascar after being imported there from Brazil where it is known as a caracacha.

Early forms of xylophone such as the atranatrana are found throughout the island and are believed to have come across with the original Indonesian settlers. The earliest of these is played uniquely by a pair of women, one of whom sits with her legs outstretched together and the bars of the xylophone resting across her legs rather than on a separate resonator box. Each woman strikes the atranatrana with a pair of sticks, one keeping the beat while the second plays a melody. The xylophone bars range from five to seven in number and are made of differing lengths of a rot-resistant wood called hazomalagny. A similar xylophone called katiboky is still played in the southwest among the Vezo and Bara ethnic groups.

== Contemporary music ==
Contemporary music comprises modern-day compositions that have their roots in traditional musical styles and have been created for entertainment purposes, typically with the intent of eventual mass dissemination via cassette, compact disc, radio or internet. Modern forms of Malagasy music may incorporate such innovations as amplified or imported instruments (particularly electric guitar, bass guitar, synthesizer and drum kit), blend the sounds of new and traditional instruments or use traditional instruments in innovative ways. As contemporary artists adapt their musical heritage to today's market, they manage to preserve the melodic, chordophone-dominated sound that distinguishes traditional Malagasy music from the more percussion-heavy traditions of mainland Africa. African genres like Coupé-décalé and Afrobeats heavily influence modern malagasy popular music.

=== Highlands ===
Rossy "Ikalasoa" (2006)
Rossy's music is a fusion of Malagasy rhythms, vocal styles and instruments distinguished by the inclusion of the hira gasy brass section.

In the 1950s and 1960s, a variety of bands in the Highlands (in the area between and around Antananarivo and Fianarantsoa) were performing covers of European and American hits or adapting mainland African tunes for local audiences. Madagascar got its first supergroup in the 1970s with Mahaleo, whose members blended traditional Malagasy sounds with soft rock to enormous and enduring success. Rossy emerged as a superstar shortly afterward, adapting the instrumentation, rhythms and vocal styles of the hira gasy to create a distinctly Malagasy radio-friendly sound. His open and enthusiastic support for then-President Didier Ratsiraka assured his band regular performances in association with Presidential functions, and his band came to define the Ratsiraka epoch for many.

Other important contemporary musicians from the Highlands include Justin Vali and Sylvestre Randafison, both valiha virtuosos; Rakoto Frah, who could play two sodina simultaneously; Solo Miral, featuring guitar played in the style of a valiha; Tarika, a Malagasy fusion band based in England; Olombelona Ricky, a highly accomplished solo vocalist, and Samoëla, a roots artist whose blunt social and political critiques propelled his group to popularity.

=== Coastal styles ===
Rabaza "Mifaneva" (2008)
Mangaliba as performed by Rabaza, featuring the kabosy

Vaiavy Chila "Walli Wallah" (2006)
Salegy as performed by Vaiavy Chila

Jarifa "Dangodango" (2003)
Tsapika as performed by Jarifa

Distinct contemporary forms of music, rooted in local musical traditions, have emerged in the coastal regions since the 1960s. Chief among these are two up-tempo dance music styles that have become especially popular across Madagascar and have achieved crossover success: salegy, a 6/8 style that originated in the northwest around Mahajanga and Antsiranana, and tsapika, a 4/4 style centered in the southwest between Toliara and Betroka. Other key coastal styles include basesa of Diego-Suarez and the northeast coast as popularized by Mika sy Davis, kilalaky of Morondava and the southwestern interior, mangaliba of the southern Anosy region performed by such groups as Rabaza, kawitry of the northeast as popularized by Jerry Marcoss, the southern beko polyharmonic tradition performed by bands like Senge and Terakaly, and kwassa-kwassa and sega music from neighboring Reunion Island and Mauritius.

==== Salegy ====
Salegy is funky, energetic dance music dominated by ringing electric guitars, accordion (real or synthesized), and call-and-response polyphonic vocals, with heavy electric bass and a driving percussion. The percussion section might include a drum kit, djembe, and shakers.

Salegy is an electrified version of the traditional antsa musical style that Tandroy singer Mama Sana used to perform at Betsimisaraka and Tsimihety rituals.

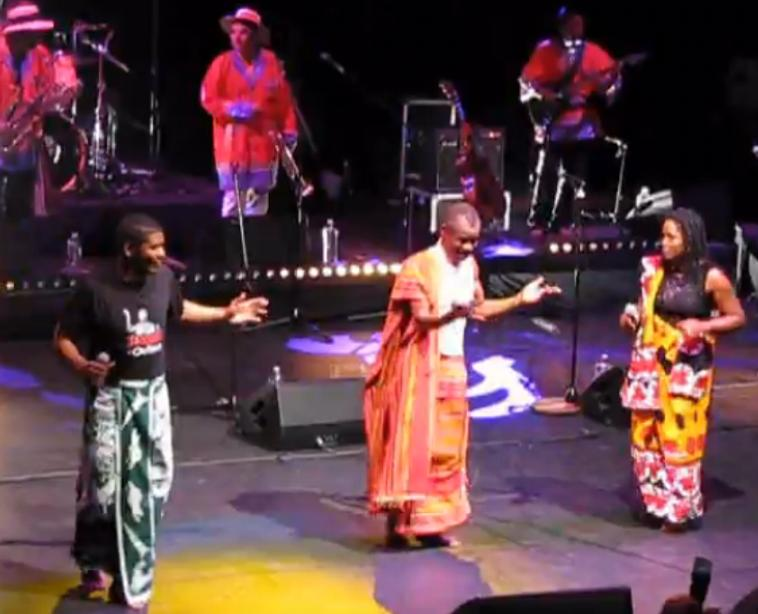
Jaojoby performing salegy for an audience in Paris

In addition to their commonalities in tempo, vocal style, and tendency toward minor keys (which some attribute to an Arab influence, and which stands in contrast to the major key dominance of Highland music), the salegy shares the antsa's structure in that it always features a middle section called the folaka ("broken") which is primarily instrumental—voice serves only to urge on more energetic dancing—and during which the vocalists (and the audience) will launch into intricate polyrhythmic hand-clapping to the beat of the music.

The major exponents of modern salegy were Jaojoby and Mily Clément. Among the later artists are Ninie Doniah, Wawa, Vaiavy Chila, and Dr. J.B. and the Jaguars.

==== Tsapiky ====
Like salegy, tsapiky is energetic dance music that originated from the traditional music of the southwestern region around Toliara and that has recently been adapted to contemporary instruments such as electric guitar, bass guitar and drum kit. Generally even more rapid than the salegy, this 4/4 form of music features a guitar performance style inspired by traditional marovany compositions, but the influence of South African township music is evident in both the guitars and polyharmonic vocals, often performed by female singers who repeat variations on a short refrain throughout the song. Tsapiky music is performed at all manner of ceremonial occasion in the South, whether a birthday celebration, community party, or funeral. While salegy had risen to national popularity by the mid-1980s (some would argue the 1970s), tsapiky only truly began to garner a similar level of widespread appreciation by the mid-1990s. It was not until the 2000 release of the "Tulear Never Sleeps" compilation album that the genre achieved international exposure on a major label. This compilation, however, showcases "traditional" tsapiky, such as might have more commonly been performed in rural villages twenty years ago, rather than the amplified, synthesized and remixed style in heavy rotation on radio stations performed by national stars like Tearano, Terakaly, Jarifa, and Mamy Gotso.

There are many more regional styles of contemporary music that have yet to achieve the level of national recognition attained by salegy and tsapiky just as there are many nationally and internationally acclaimed musicians who draw upon the musical traditions of the coastal regions in their compositions. Of note are Hazolahy (a largely acoustic roots band from the Southeast that plays mangaliba), D'Gary (an acclaimed acoustic guitarist from the inland South near Betroka), and Toto Mwandjani (who popularized Congolese ndombolo-style guitar, and whose band performs a fusion of Central/East African and Malagasy dance styles).

=== Popular music ===
Oladad "Salamanga" (2010)
Malagasy group Oladad blends hip-hop and traditional Betsileo influences, including kabosy and rija.

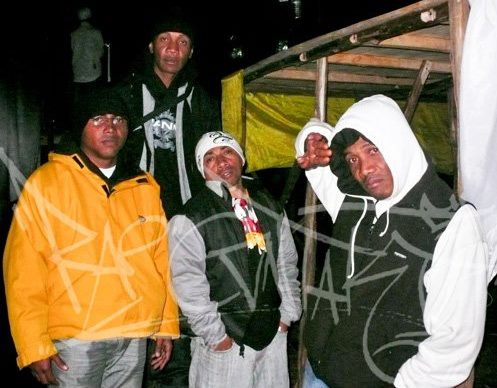
Da Hopp, the godfathers of Malagasy hip-hop

A wide range of foreign music styles have been popularized in Madagascar, including French chanson performed by artists such as Poopy, reggae, gospel music, and pop rock performed by bands such as Green and AmbondronA. Since mid-2010s malagasy popular music has been a blend of malagasy music, tropical music (Zouk) and African genres like Coupé décalé and Afrobeats. Artists of this new wave of malagasy music include Black Nadia, Vaiavy Chila, LIANAH and BIG MJ. Jazz has been popularized by artists such as Nicolas Vatomanga. Malagasy hip hop broke into the mainstream in the mid-nineties and has since skyrocketed to popularity through artists such as Da Hopp and 18,3. More recently bands like Oladad are experimenting with the fusion of hip-hop and traditional Malagasy musical styles and instruments. There is also a small metal scene with bands like Sasamaso being the most prominent.Dancehall has gained popularity in Madagascar since late 2010s with artists like Mad Max and Basta Lion.

== Performance of Malagasy music ==
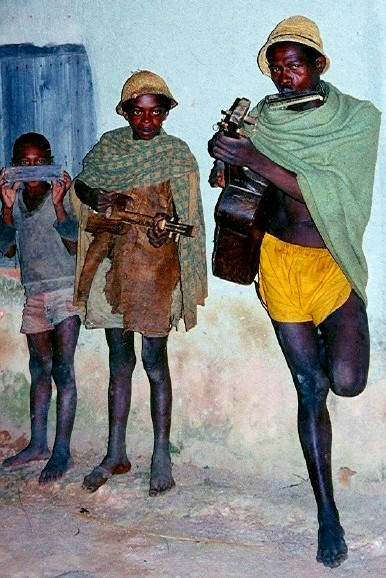
Betsileo farmers playing harmonica, kabosy and guitar

Music has long served a variety of secular and sacred purposes in Madagascar. Song may accompany daily tasks, provide entertainment, preserve history or communicate social and political messages. Music is likewise integral to the experience of spiritual ritual among many ethnic and religious groups on the island.

=== Secular performance ===
Among some ethnic groups music would help advance a repetitive or arduous task. Geo Shaw, a missionary to Madagascar in the 19th century, described observing Betsileo and Merina serfs singing in the rice fields, "timing the music to the movements of their bodies, so that at each accented note they plant a stalk." Similarly, songs may accompany the paddling of dugout canoes on long journeys. Music may also accompany another form of entertainment, such as songs chanted by female spectators at matches of moraingy, a traditional form of full-body wrestling popular in coastal regions.

The preservation of oral history may be achieved through musical performance in Madagascar. Among the Betsileo, for instance, oral histories are retold through a form of musical performance called the rija, which in its current form may represent a combination of the original, single-verse rija and an epic poem called the isa. The Betsileo rija is performed by two men who each play a jejy while singing very loudly with a strained pitch in the soprano range. The structure of the song is complex and, unlike other Malagasy musical styles, parallel thirds are not predominant in the harmony. Other Southern ethnic groups also perform simplified variations of the rija featuring for example a solo musician who strums rather than fiddles his accompanying instrument and sings at a lower, more natural pitch. While the Betsileo rija can address diverse themes, those performed by other southern groups are almost always praise songs recalling a favorably memorable event.

Troupe Analamanga "Mifankatiava Ihany" (1929)
"Mifankatiava Ihany" is a well-known classic of theatrical ba-gasy vocal style.

Madame Razafindriantsoa Afindrafindrao ("Move It Softly") (1894)
Afindrafindrao is the final Malagasy quadrille composed for the royal court prior to French colonization in 1896.

Endogenous musical styles may also serve as a form of artistic expression, as in the highly syncopated ba-gasy genre of Imerina. The ba-gasy emerged in conjunction with the French introduction of operetta and the subsequent rise of Malagasy theater at the Theatre Municipale d'Isotry beginning in the late 1910s. The vocal style used in ba-gasy is characterized by female use of angola, a vocal ornamentation delivered in a nasal tone, offset by the fasiny (tenor) and rapid-moving beno (baritone) line sung by the men. Ba-gasy inspired the musical duet style Kaolon'ny Fahiny, popularized in Imerina during the final two decades of the colonial period, in which the ba-gasy vocal sensibilities are applied to love themes and accompanied by a syncopated composition for piano or occasionally guitar.

Musical performance in the Highlands took on a distinctly political and educative role through the hira gasy (hira: song; gasy: Malagasy). The hira gasy is a day-long spectacle of music, dance, and a stylized form of traditional oratory known as kabary performed by a troupe or as a competition between two or more troupes. While the origins of the hira gasy are uncertain, oral history attributes its modern form to 18th century Merina king Andrianampoinimerina, who reportedly employed musicians to gather the public together for royal speeches and announcements (kabary) and to entertain them as they labored on public works projects such as building dikes to irrigate the rice paddies surrounding Antananarivo. Over time, these musicians formed independent troupes who used and continue to use the non-threatening performance format to explore sensitive social and political themes in the public arena.

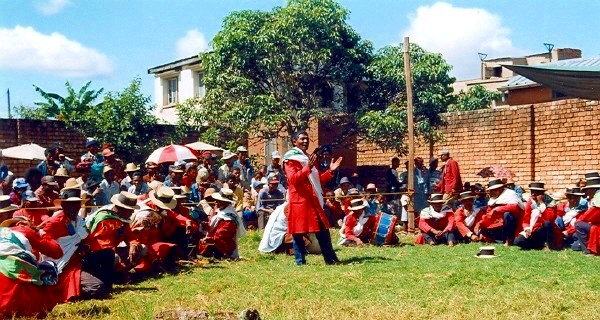
Hira gasy performance of kabary in Antananarivo, 1999

The hira gasy troupes of today are remnants of a tradition of court musicians that persisted through the end of the 19th century. Under Queen Ranavalona III, the final monarch in the Merina dynasty, there were three official groups of state musicians: one for the queen, one for her prime minister, and another for the city of Antananarivo. The queen's troupe consisted of over 300 musicians. Until slavery was abolished, musicians in these groups were members of the slave class (andevo) directed by a Hova (free Merina). Each year at Christmas, the directors of each group would arrange a performance before the queen of a new original composition; the queen would select a winner among the three. While court musicians (and therefore the earliest hira gasy troupes) originally performed using traditional instruments – namely the sodina, jejy voatavo and drums - over the course of the 19th century the increasing European influence led court musicians and hira gasy troupes alike to make increasing use of foreign instruments such as violins, clarinets, trombones and trumpets. The tradition of the court musician died out with the abolition of the monarchy in Madagascar after French colonization, but the hira gasy tradition has continued to thrive.

Musical styles from abroad have been merged with pre-existing Malagasy musical traditions to create distinctly Malagasy sounds with foreign roots. An example of this is the Afindrafindrao, a tune based on the French quadrille that was popularized in the Malagasy court in the 19th century. A specific form of partner dance accompanies this piece, in which dancers will form a long chain of male-female pairs with the woman at the front of each pair, both facing forward holding each other's hands while advancing to the rhythm of the music. From its origins as a courtly dance, the afindrafindrao today is a quintessentially Malagasy tradition performed at the beginning of a social event or concert to kick off the festivities.

=== Sacred performance ===
Music is a common element of spiritual ritual and ceremonies throughout the island. For instance, members of hira gasy troupes are traditionally invited to perform at the famadihana reburial ceremonies of central Madagascar. In coastal regions, music is crucial to helping a medium enter a trance state during a tromba ritual. While in a trance, the medium is possessed by an ancestral spirit. Each spirit is believed to prefer a particular tune or style of music and will not enter the medium unless the suitable piece of music is performed at the ceremony.

British missionaries of the London Missionary Society (LMS) arrived in Antananarivo in 1820 during the reign of King Radama I. The subsequent spread of Christianity in Madagascar was coupled with the introduction of solfège as missionaries developed Malagasy-language hymns for their nascent church. The first wave of missionaries was obliged to depart Madagascar under Ranavalona I in 1836, but the hymns they developed became anthems for early Malagasy converts persecuted under the Queen's traditionalist policies. In 1871, an LMS missionary (J. Richardson) improved the rhythm and harmony of these original hymns, which were considerably influenced by European musical styles such as quadrilles and waltzes. Originally, church music was performed by slaves seated in groups of four to five at the front of the church. By the 1870s a more European congregational style had been adopted with all members of the church rising to their feet to sing together.

== See also ==
- Andy Razaf, (1895–1973), US composer, lyricist and poet of Malagasy descent
- Taralila, a Malagasy style of concertina
