= Fihavanana =

Fihavanana is a Malagasy concept of kinship, solidarity and mutual goodwill that is widely regarded as a central value of Malagasy culture. The word derives from havana, meaning "kin" or "relative", and has no exact equivalent in English. Translations offered in the scholarly literature include kinship, friendship, solidarity, good relationship and readiness to help.

== Concept ==
Fihavanana denotes a state of peace and harmony within a community, modelled on the closeness, love and solidarity associated with family ties. Although rooted in the family, the concept extends outward to friends, neighbours and the wider community, and encompasses relations with the ancestors and the spiritual world.

The value placed on fihavanana is reflected in numerous Malagasy proverbs (ohabolana), such as Aleo very tsikalakalam-bola toy izay very tsikalakalam-pihavanana ("better to lose a little money than to lose a little fihavanana").

== Social and political role ==
Anthropologists and economists have described fihavanana as an informal system of norms that underpins mutual aid, reciprocal labour and conflict resolution in rural Malagasy communities. In the twentieth century, fihavanana malagasy ("Malagasy solidarity") became a prominent element of national identity, invoked as the vision of a peaceful society and as a means of consensual, non-violent conflict resolution. The historian and anthropologist Peter Kneitz has argued that this national concept of fihavanana emerged in response to the social ruptures of the colonial encounter, rather than being a simple continuation of pre-colonial practice.

The concept is not used uniformly across the island: among the Bara of southern Madagascar, the related term filongoa is used for kin solidarity, while the national rhetoric of fihavanana gasy has little local resonance.

Malagasy culture is full of proverbs related to fihavanana: “Ny Fihavanana no taloha ny vola”, which loosely translated means “The relationship is more important than the money”. But fihavanana is more than just “relationship”. It comes from the belief that we are all one blood and that how we treat others will eventually be reflected back to us; and that we should be proactive about goodwill for the good of the world. Fihavanana is not limited to the present but can also be applied to our relationship with the spiritual world.

Fihavanana has been compared to the Southern African concept of ubuntu (philosophy)
