= AmbondronA =

- Origin: Madagascar
- Genres: Pop rock
- Years active: 2001-present
- Members: Kix; Honty; Beranto; Blanc; Ranto; Mboux

AmbondronA is a pop rock band from Madagascar. The band has figured prominently in the Malagasy music scene since 2001.

AmbondronA has toured extensively throughout Madagascar, and has given numerous performances throughout the Indian Ocean Islands, France and South Africa. The band has released six albums.

In 2012, the members of the band were selected by the United States Embassy in Antananarivo to participate in an International Visitors' Leadership Program on the theme of "Protecting the Environment through Music." Their nomination followed a collaboration with the U.S. Department of State in which AmbondronA filmed a music video at Ranomafana National Park and promoted environmental conservation and green tourism in Madagascar. As part of the International Visitors' Leadership Program, the band performed in several U.S. cities, including Denver, Colorado and Portland, Oregon.

== See also ==
- Music of Madagascar
