= Naka Rabemanantsoa =

Malagasy pianist and composer

- Born: Madagascar
- Genres: Ba-gasy, Vakondrazana
- Occupation(s): Pianist, composer
- Instrument(s): Piano, acoustic guitar

Naka Rabemanantsoa is a pianist and composer of vakondrazana and ba-gasy music from the central highlands of Madagascar. He was a major composer for the Malagasy theatrical genre that reached its peak between 1920 and 1940 at the Theatre d'Isotry in Antananarivo. His pieces were typically written for piano, and although his pieces were often adapted for solo, duet or choral vocal accompaniment sung in the Malagasy language, he was a strong proponent of preserving strictly instrumental accompaniment for theatrical performances. His songs form part of the canon of classical Malagasy piano music, and a street in downtown Antananarivo is named after him.

== See also ==
- Music of Madagascar

== Bibliography ==
- Blum, Bruno (2007). De l'art de savoir chanter, danser et jouer la bamboula comme un éminent musicien africain: le guide des musiques africaines (in French). Paris: Editions Scali. ISBN 9782350121970.
- University of Virginia (1992). Notre librairie, Issues 108-115. Paris: C.L.E.F.
- Trillard, Marc (1999). Madagascar (in French). Paris: Editions Marcus. ISBN 9782713101410.
