= Tsapiky =

Musical genre native to Madagascar

- Stylistic origins: South African pop and Malagasy tradition
- Cultural origins: Toliara Province, Madagascar

Tsapiky, rhythm and musical style characteristic of the South-West region of Madagascar
- UNESCO Intangible Cultural Heritage
- Country: Madagascar
- Reference: 02272
- Region: Africa

Inscription history
- Inscription: 2025 (20th session)
- List: Representative

Tsapiky (Malagasy pronunciation: [t͡sapʲikʲ]) is a musical genre popular in southwest Madagascar, particularly in the former Toliara Province. It was created as a fusion between South African pop (originally picked up from Mozambican radio stations) and native Malagasy tradition in the 1970s. The music is characterized by its jerky rhythms and fast beat. The genre sees popularity in the contexts of sports events, night clubs, balls, celebrations, and funerals. Common instruments in tsapiky include: guitar, electric guitars, bass, drums, accordions, synthesizers, and vocals (usually provided by a choir of women).

Although initially consisting of solely acoustic instruments, in the 1980s, tsapiky also integrated electric guitars.

== Festivals ==
Tsapiky festivals primarily occur in urban centers, such as Toliara. These festivals last for several days to a week, and consist of several concerts played for hours, supposedly inducing trance-like states from audience members. Typically, entire families come along, bearing gifts.

== See also and further reading ==
- Salegy
- Music of Madagascar
