= Eusèbe Jaojoby =

Composer and singer from Madagascar

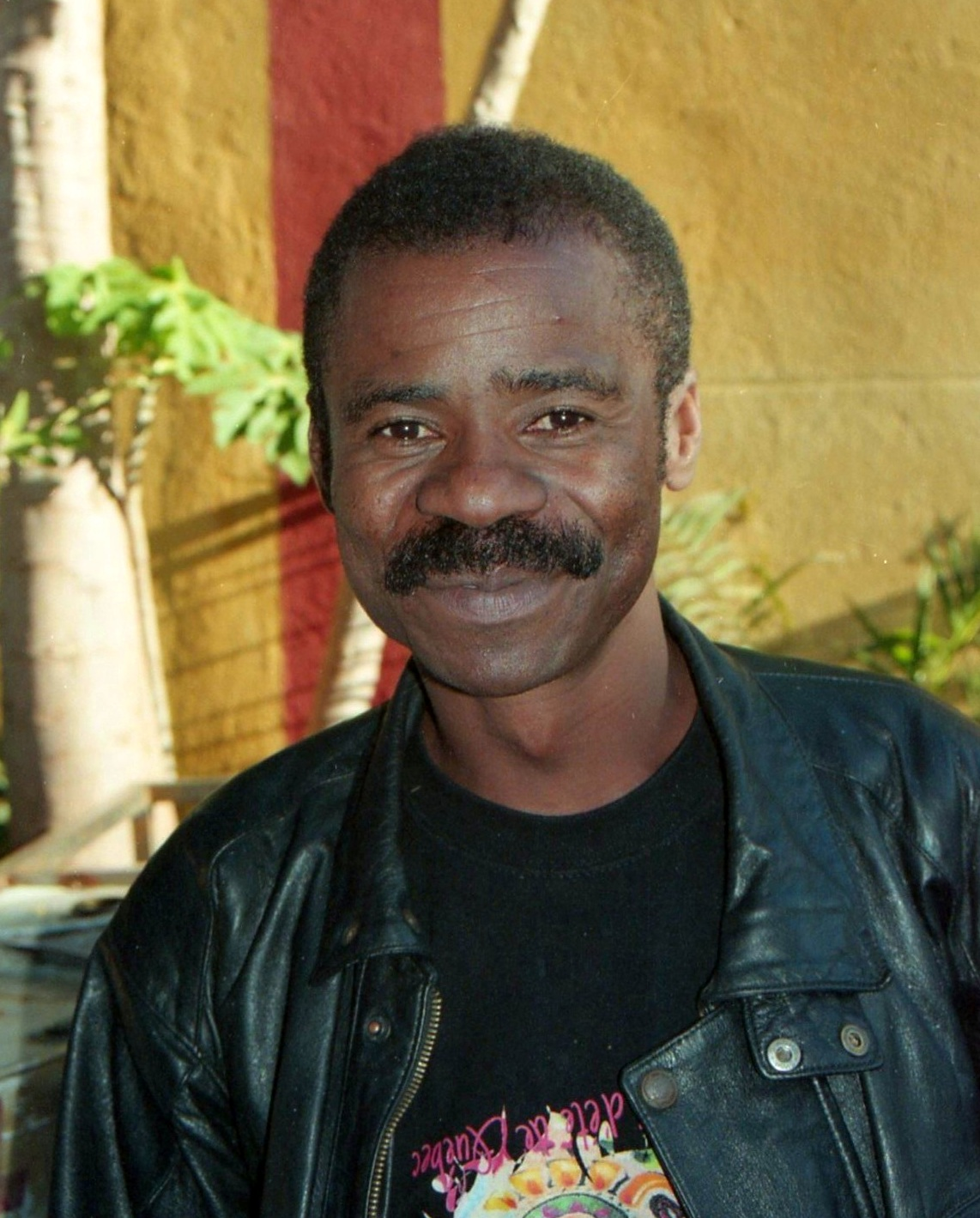
- Jaojoby outside Le Bus nightclub in Antananarivo, 1999

Background information
- Born: 29 July 1955 (age 70); Anboahangibe, French Madagascar
- Genres: Salegy
- Instrument: Voice (tenor)
- Years active: 1972–present

Eusèbe Jaojoby (born 29 July 1955), commonly known by his surname Jaojoby [ˈdzodzubʲ], is a Malagasy composer and singer of salegy, a musical style of northwestern Madagascar. Critics consider him to be one of the originators of the modern salegy style that emerged in the 1970s, and credit him with transforming the genre from an obscure regional musical tradition into one of national and international popularity. Jaojoby also contributed to the creation of two salegy subgenres, malessa and baoenjy. Jaojoby has been called the most popular singer in Madagascar and the Indian Ocean islands, and is widely referred to as the "King of Salegy". His success has earned him such honors as Artist of the Year in Madagascar for two consecutive years (1998–1999) and the role of Goodwill Ambassador for the United Nations Population Fund in 1999.

In 1970 Jaojoby began singing in the northern coastal town of Diego-Suarez. He performed with bands that were experimentally blending American soul and funk with the Malagasy musical traditions of the region. The artist gained popularity and toured regionally, producing four singles with The Players before the band broke up in 1979. After a short break in the 1980s to pursue a career in journalism, Jaojoby resumed his musical career and rose to national prominence with his 1988 hit "Samy Mandeha Samy Mitady". He then reoriented his career toward music, recording his first full-length album in 1992 and becoming a full-time professional musician the following year. He has since released eight full-length albums and has toured extensively in Madagascar and abroad accompanied by his wife and adult children, who perform in the band with him.

== Early years ==
Eusèbe Jaojoby was born on 29 July 1955, to a Sakalava family in the village of Anboahangibe, near Sambava in the northeastern coastal Sava Region of Madagascar. Jaojoby and his twelve younger brothers and sisters were raised Catholic; early experiences singing hymns in the local church choir and traditional folk songs at local Betsimisaraka moonlight village festivals made him realize he possessed vocal talent. At the age of 15, Jaojoby's father sent him to continue his studies in Diego-Suarez, one of the six regional capitals at the time. The town was home to a large contingent of French soldiers and expatriates, and contemporary Western genres were commonly heard on the radio and in the town's many nightclubs. Jaojoby was inspired by these styles and particularly by Freddy Ranarison, who in the 1960s became the first Malagasy musician to use an electric guitar to perform coastal musical styles.

One month after moving to Diego-Suarez, Jaojoby entered a local talent competition and managed to win despite singing unaccompanied and without a microphone. He began to perform in nightclubs whenever the opportunity presented itself. The uncle with whom he was lodging sent word of Jaojoby's activities to the young singer's parents, who consulted a priest before giving their son permission to continue exploring his musical talents on the condition that he continue to perform well at school. Jaojoby agreed to this provision, studying during the day and performing at night for several years. In 1972 he began singing with Los Matadores, the well-established house band of the Saigonais nightclub in Diego-Suarez. This group catered to the club's primarily Western clientele by performing cover songs and rhythm and blues compositions in French and English, occasionally incorporating traditional instruments like kabosy and drums, or experimenting with local musical styles using electric guitar, bass, and drum kit, accompanied by traditional Malagasy language vocal performance.

Tsaikijoby
One of four early Jaojoby songs recorded in the 1970s, performed by Jaojoby and The Players (1976)

Experimental blending of Western and Malagasy musical elements was occurring simultaneously among a number of northwestern bands and musicians of Jaojoby's generation. Although no single individual can be credited with creating the modern salegy genre, Jaojoby ranks among the earliest originators of the nascent musical style. A desire for greater freedom to write songs and further develop the syncretic modern salegy style led Jaojoby to leave Los Matadores in 1975 for The Players, another regional band that was less well-established but more willing to take risks. The band was managed by a Chinese shopkeeper who provided them with a sound system and generator. The band toured northwestern Madagascar for the next four years with increasing success, recording two 45rpm singles and performing in Mahajanga, Diego-Suarez, and other towns and villages throughout the region before disbanding in 1979.

After briefly performing with a band named Kintana, Jaojoby moved to Antananarivo where he studied sociology for two years at the University of Antananarivo before accepting an offer to work for the national radio station as a journalist at the end of 1980. The following year, Jaojoby met the manager of the local Hilton hotel by chance while the two were waiting together at a bus stop. Accepting the manager's invitation to audition at the hotel's Papillon bar that same night, Jaojoby performed a cover of James Brown's "Sex Machine". The manager interrupted him mid-song to offer Jaojoby a contract to give regular evening performances there with the Rabeson family, a popular jazz act. For the next three years Jaojoby spent his days at the national radio and his evenings singing at the Papillon with the exception of a short interlude in 1982 when he was sent to East Berlin to complete an advanced course at the International Institute of Journalism. Jaojoby was promoted to Director of the Regional Information Service in Diego-Suarez in 1984, necessitating his relocation back to the northwest coast and bringing his cabaret performances to an end.

== King of Salegy ==
Velono
Title track from Velono (1994)

After several years having focused entirely on his career with the Regional Information Service, Jaojoby was approached in 1987 by Frenchman Pierre Henri Donat to contribute several recordings to Madagascar's first salegy compilation album, Les Grands Maîtres du Salegy ("Grand Masters of Salegy"). The runaway success of one of the tracks he composed and performed, "Samy Mandeha Samy Mitady", elevated salegy from a regional genre to one of nationwide popularity, leading a newspaper to declare him the "King of Salegy". High demand for live performances led the singer to return to Antananarivo in 1988 to form a band named "Jaojoby" that included former bandmates from Los Matadores and The Players. Jaojoby begin touring regularly at home and abroad, performing his first international concerts in Paris in 1989. In the meantime, he worked as a press attaché for the Ministry of Transport, Meteorology and Tourism from 1990 until 1993, at which point he left his job to become a full-time musician.

The 1992 release of Jaojoby's first full-length album, titled Salegy!, was facilitated by fRoots magazine editor Ian Anderson, who had worked with Jaojoby to record several of his tracks for a radio broadcast two years previously. Jaojoby's second album, Velono, was the first salegy album to be recorded in France, as well as the first of his albums to be produced in a professional-quality recording studio. Following the 1994 release of Velono, Jaojoby became a regular on the international music festival circuit and has performed at such events as WOMAD in Reading, the Festival du Bout du Monde in Brittany, WOMEX in Spain, the Festival des Musiques Métisses in Angoulême, the MASA Festival in Abidjan, and similar events in Germany, the Netherlands, and Portugal. Jaojoby's excitement over his rise to international celebrity was attenuated by the 1995 death of the band's original drummer, Jean-Claude Djaonarana, who had first performed with Jaojoby as a member of Los Matadores.

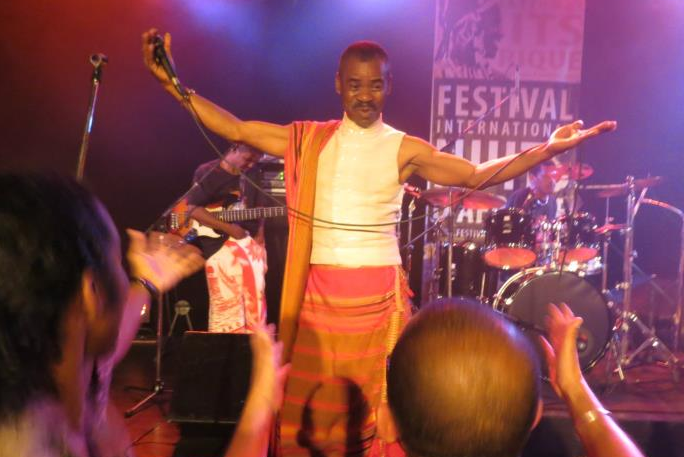
Jaojoby in concert wearing a traditional lamba

Jaojoby's success and popularity attained new heights in 1998 with the release of E! Tiako. He was named "Artist of the Year" in Madagascar for two consecutive years (1998–1999), and the single "Malemilemy" received regular airplay across the island more than a year after the album was released. In July 1999, Jaojoby was named Goodwill Ambassador to the United Nations Population Fund and supported the United Nations' activities in Madagascar related to raising awareness of sexually transmitted diseases, unintended pregnancy, and other concerns relevant to the Malagasy youth population. The lyrics of his songs commonly address social issues, typified by a track on E! Tiako that encourages the use of condoms to avoid contracting HIV/AIDS.

Aza Arianao was recorded over five days in the summer of 2000 and released the following year. In the wake of its success, Jaojoby performed at a political rally to an audience of 50,000 partisans of candidate Marc Ravalomanana less than a month before the divisive 2001 presidential elections that nearly resulted in the secession of the island's coastal provinces. Jaojoby's 2004 follow-up album Malagasy, which was recorded in semi-live conditions on the island of Réunion in a small venue before an audience of the artist's friends, featured lyrics that sought to promote optimism and national reconciliation; the artist announced that he would not involve himself in national politics in the future. The same year he toured extensively in France, the United States and Canada.

The March 2008 release of Donnant-Donnant celebrated Jaojoby's roots as a cabaret performer of soul, funk, and other Western popular genres. The track listing included previously unreleased pop songs written by the artist in the 1970s and 1980s in French, Malagasy, Creole, and English. Later that year, in September, he became the second Malagasy musical act (after supergroup Mahaleo, in 2007) to perform at the prestigious and historic Olympia music hall in Paris. Seating was specially removed at his request to provide space for dancing. The live album Live au Bato Fou: Jaojoby was released in 2010 and features a diverse sampling of Jaojoby's greatest hits. A selection of new salegy tracks written and performed by Jaojoby was released in 2012 under the album title Mila Anao, which was ranked by NPR as one of the ten best international albums of the year.

== Style and legacy ==
[Jaojoby] dusted off salegy and freed it of its image as a primitive music that served only to relieve peasants exhausted by their labors ... The soul-tinted voice of Jaojoby, warm and powerful, sings about love and life with the frankness typical of northerners, marked with ancestral wisdom and popular philosophy. For the first time, one realizes that salegy can be really listened to and not just inspire maniacal dancing. To the oubliettes with the minimalist "hard salegy" of the 1970s with its three chords, drum solos and Farfisa organ! With Jaojoby, salegy passed from a marginal genre into the ranks of essential culture, soon afterward imitated by a wave of others ...

— "Jaojoby : 30 ans de scène", Madagascar Tribune (October 12, 2000)

The roots of Jaojoby's musical style began with his childhood exposure to the Western-Malagasy syncretism of local church hymns, and the rhythm, harmonies, and form of the traditional antsa style of northern Madagascar. The antsa is a choral style common across northern Madagascar characterized by large group performance of minor polyharmonies over a highly syncopated multi-rhythmic hand-clap or other percussive accompaniment. Upon relocating to Diego-Suarez, Jaojoby was exposed to Western artists and musical genres, as well as the music of Freddy Ranarison, the first local artist to popularize the adaptation of traditional Malagasy styles to the electric guitar. Singing with Los Matadores provided Jaojoby with the opportunity to cover the hits of his idols, including Otis Redding, Percy Sledge, and James Brown. During his years performing with this band and his subsequent group, Les Players, Jaojoby adeptly covered hits from a vast range of regional and international genres ranging from the jerk, tango and, cha-cha-cha to the sega and slow romantic ballads. Together, these musical influences formed the basis of Jaojoby's style.

In the 1960s bands such as Orchestra Liberty began performing the antsa rhythm on modern drum kits with accompanying guitar or accordion replacing the traditional vocals. It was not until the 1970s that bands like Los Matadores and Les Players adapted the traditional vocal style to the newly electrified antsa. Guitar solos were inspired by the performance style of traditional Malagasy instruments like the valiha and marovany, combined with that of guitar solo work popularized in the Congo and Côte d'Ivoire. As a singer with Los Matadores, Jaojoby occasionally filled the instrumental breaks of rhythm and blues covers with improvised vocals inspired by the salegy tradition, to the jubilation of the young Malagasy listeners gathered outside the club's doors. Later, with The Players, Jaojoby and a handful of peers in northern urban areas experimented with incorporating vocals into the early instrumental salegy. Jaojoby described the adaptation of the traditional antsa style to modern instruments in the following terms: "The singing is that of the cattle herders moving their herds. The guitar imitates the great masters of the valiha. The keyboards provide the feeling of the traditional accordions, and the bass draws from the sound of the five traditional tuned drums. As far as the drum kit, well, it reproduces the ambiance of a Malagasy crowd on a day of celebration with all the hand clapping, shakers, and feet stomping the earth." The salegy rhythm was adapted to the modern drum kit by Jean Claude Djaonarana, drummer of Los Matadores, who later rejoined Jaojoby's band from 1988 until his death in 1995.

French world music magazine Mondomix has called Jaojoby the most popular singer in Madagascar and the Indian Ocean islands. He is widely referred to as the "King of Salegy" by his fans and the press. He composes all of his own music and writes the lyrics to his songs himself. According to Zomaré magazine, the quality of Jaojoby's "supple tenor" voice, the creativity of his compositions and the singer's willingness to experiment have helped to distinguish him from his peers. Radio France Internationale described his vocal performance as "clear, powerful and energetic ... his trademark, which makes him stand out in the Malagasy musical panorama". Critics have credited Jaojoby with popularizing the salegy genre both within Madagascar and on the international music scene, and have identified him as an originator of two derivative versions of salegy, malessa and baoenjy.

== Family and personal life ==
Since the mid-1990s, Jaojoby's wife and children have formed part of the standard lineup of his band. His wife, Claudine Robert Zafinera, provides backing and occasional lead vocals. The couple's son, Elie Lucas, plays lead guitar while their daughters, Eusebia and Roseliane, provide backing vocals and stage dancing. His children also formed a band called Jaojoby Jr. that performs covers of their father's music as well as some of their own original salegy compositions. Saramba, a group created by Claudine in 2005, performs the traditional form of salegy using only accordion, percussion, and vocals.

While traveling to Antananarivo after a performance at the 2006 Donia Festival in Nosy Be, Jaojoby and his family were involved in a road accident. The singer suffered four broken ribs, lung damage and a fractured pelvis that necessitated emergency surgery in Réunion, three weeks of hospitalization, and prolonged physical therapy to enable Jaojoby to regain the ability to walk. Fans of the singer used mail and the Internet to successfully raise the funds required to cover medical expenses related to the accident. After several weeks of bed rest following the surgery, Joajoby went on to make a full recovery.

On 3 June 2011, Jaojoby opened a new cabaret venue called "Jao's Pub" in the Ambohipo neighborhood of Antananarivo, where the singer and his family reside.

== Discography ==
Title	Released	Label	Tracks (Length)
Tsaikijoby	1976	Discomad	2 (7'54")
Agny rô	1978	Discomad	2 (6'57")
Salegy!	1992	Xenophile (1996 – US)/Rogue (1992 – UK)	10 (53'53")
Velono	1994	Indigo – Label Bleu	11 (55'11")
E Tiako	1998	Indigo – Label Bleu	11 (44'31")
Aza Arianao	2000	Indigo – Label Bleu	12 (50'15")
Malagasy	2004	Discorama	12 (55'18")
Donnant-Donnant	2008	Edition Mars	15 (unknown)
Live au Bato Fou: Jaojoby	2010	Discorama	12 (58'55")
Mila Anao	2012	Buda Musique	14 (57'58")

== Bibliography ==
- Anderson, Ian (2000). "Ocean Music from Southeast Africa". The Rough Guide to World Music, Vol. 1: Africa, Europe and the Middle East. London: Rough Guides. ISBN 978-1-84353-551-5.
- Auzias, Dominique; Labourdette, Jean-Paul (2007). Petit futé de Madagascar 2008-2009 (in French). Paris: Petit Futé. ISBN 978-2-74691-982-2.

== See also ==
- Media related to Jaojoby at Wikimedia Commons
- Music of Madagascar
