= Marovany =

Box zither of Madagascar

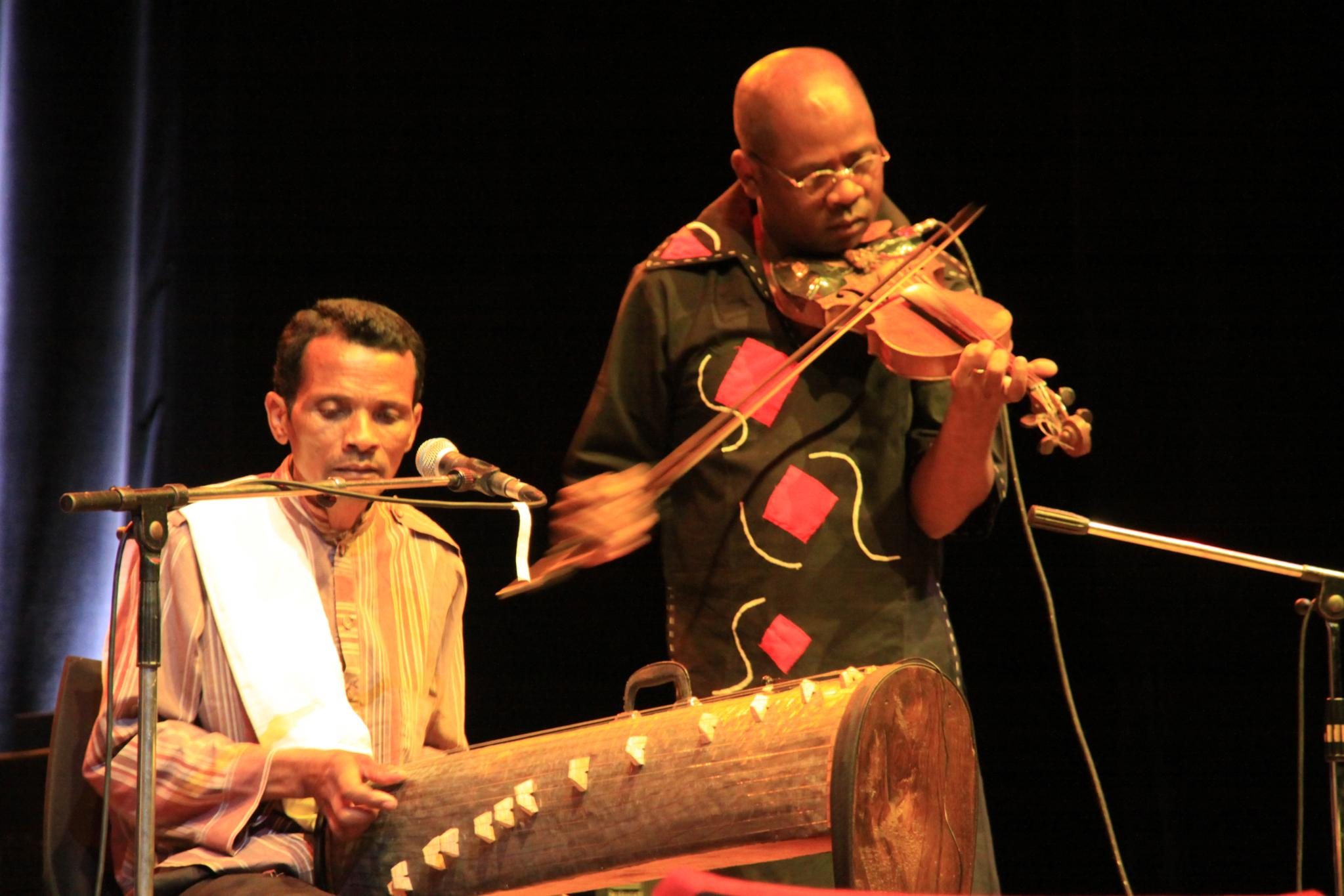
Marovany and violin player

The marovany (formerly spelled marouvane) is a suitcase shaped, wooden, type of box zither from Madagascar, used in Malagasy music. It is strung on both sides with metal strings. The player plucks the strings with both hands, often with rapid alternation. This often creates complex rhythmic patterns, typical of Malagasy music. It is tuned in sequences of thirds. The instrument is commonly used in rituals and spiritual gatherings.

== Cultural significance ==
The marovany and other instruments are used by Madagascar musical troupes at reburial ceremonies, where the music is believed to help a medium better enter a trance state during rituals which will only be successful if the correct type of music is being played.

== See also ==
- Music of Madagascar
- Valiha
