= Kabosy =

Wooden guitar instrument played in Madagascar

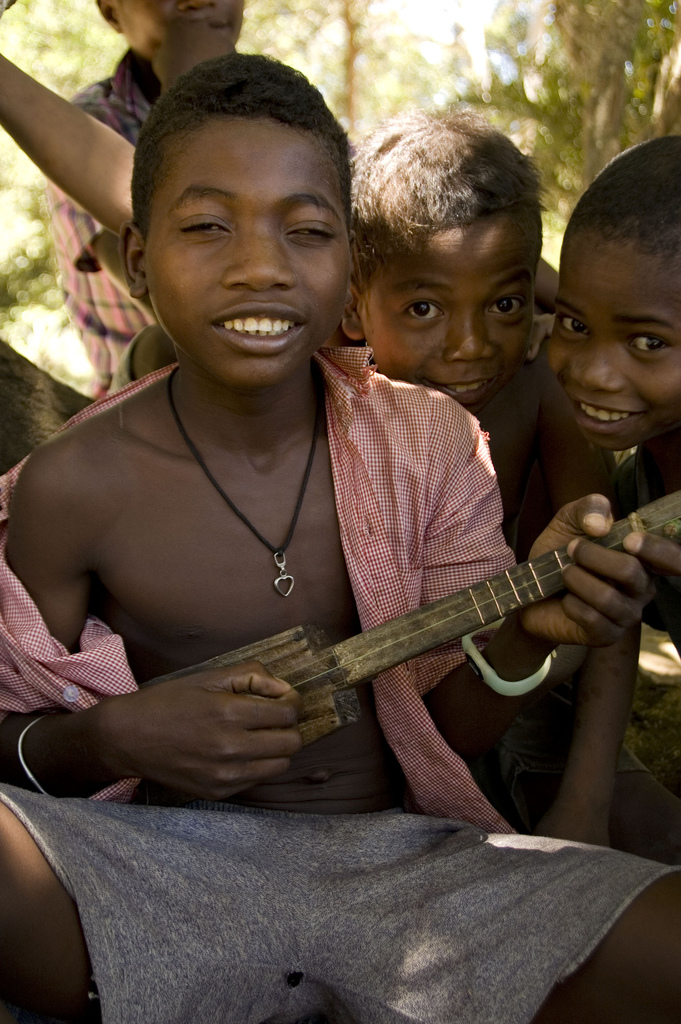
A boy playing a mandoliny or kabosy with full fretting.

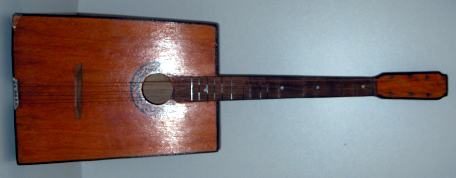
Kabosy.

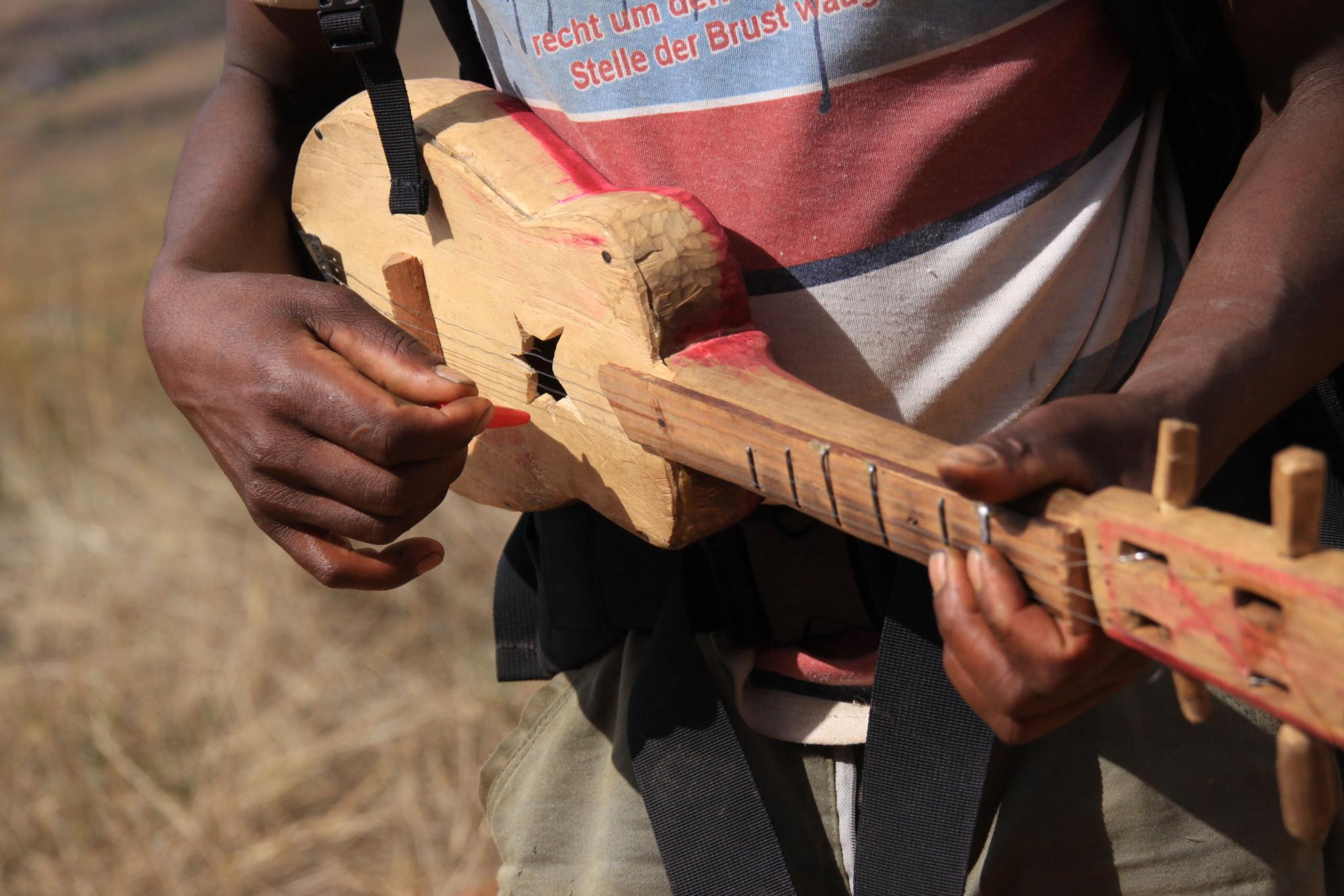
A guitar-shaped Kabosy.

The kabosy is a box-shaped wooden guitar commonly played in music of Madagascar. It has four to six strings and is commonly thought to be a direct descendant of the Arabic oud through the gambus played in Malay-populated areas of Southeast Asia. The kabosy has staggered frets, many of which do not even cross the entire fretboard, and is generally tuned to an open chord.

A kabosy-like instrument with standard frets is known as a mandalina or mandoliny.

Kabosys are frequently handmade from scavenged materials, and their form varies greatly depending on the builder and materials available. Kabosys may be strung with nylon (often used fishing line) or steel (often from scrap wire or cable).
