= Salegy =

Music genre in Madagascar

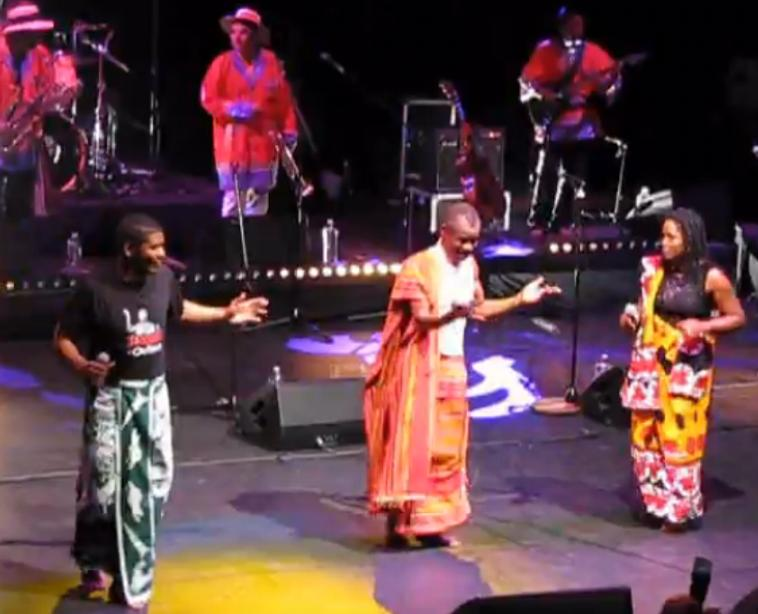
Salegy artist Jaojoby performing in Paris

Salegy (Malagasy pronunciation: [ˈsaleɡʲ]) is a popular music genre from Madagascar. Originating as a Sub-Saharan African folk music style in the northwestern coastal areas of Madagascar, modern salegy is the genre of Malagasy music that has gained the widest recognition and commercial popularity in the international market. Its sound is considered emblematic of the island. Eusèbe Jaojoby, a Sakalava singer from Anboahangibe, was a key originator of the style and is widely considered the "King of Salegy".

The contemporary, electrified form of popular salegy originated from traditional acoustic roots in northwestern Madagascar around Mahajanga and Antsiranana in the 1950s. It has been popularized by originators like Jaojoby and relative newcomers such as Ninie Doniah, Vaiavy Chila and Dr. J.B. and the Jaguars. The style is funky and energetic, dominated by ringing electric guitars, real or synthesized accordion, and call-and-response polyphonic vocals, propelled by heavy electric bass and a driving percussion section typically including a drum kit, djembe and shakers. The syncopated, polyrhythmic beat of salegy is rapid (typically around 290BPM) and features a distinctive percussion pattern performed on a Western drum kit in 6/8 or 12/4 time with accents on the 3rd or 7th beat. The melody and harmonies are often in the A minor key and feature beautiful high-life electric guitar and synthesized accordion lines. The sound of salegy can be heard at night clubs, cabarets, parties and dance floors across the island.

Salegy represents an electrified version of the antsa musical style that was traditionally performed at Betsimisaraka and Tsimihety rituals. In addition to their commonalities in tempo, vocal style, and tendency toward minor keys (which some attribute to an Arab influence, and which stands in contrast to the major key dominance of Highland music), the salegy shares the antsa's structure in that it always features a middle section called the folaka ("broken") which is primarily instrumental—voice serves only to urge on more energetic dancing—and during which the vocalists (and the audience) will launch into intricate polyrhythmic hand-clapping to the beat of the music.

== Artists and bands ==
- Anziza Salema
- Arsène Félix
- Dr. J.B. and the Jaguars
- Fenoamby
- Eusèbe Jaojoby
- Fredy de Majunga
- Gérard Tsapalôko
- IO Anay
- Jaojoby Junior
- Joacin-tapaka
- Lazard
- Mily Clément
- Mister Rotsirotsy
- Ninie Doniah
- Olga del Madagascar
- Paskaal Japhet
- SISCA
- Tianjama
- Vaiavy Chila
- Wawa
