= Oluwafemi =

Olúwafẹ́mi
- Gender: Unisex
- Language: Yoruba

Origin
- Origin: Yoruba
- Meaning: God love me
- Region of origin: Yorubaland

Olúwafẹ́mi is a common Nigerian given unisex name of Yoruba origin which means God loves me. It has a diminutive form that is called Olufemi.

== Notable people with the name ==
- Oluwafemi Junior Ajayi (born 1996), Nigerian footballer
- Oluwafemi Ajilore (born 1985), Nigerian footballer
- Oluwafemi Ajisafe, Nigerian academic
- Oluwafemi Azeez (born 2001), English footballer
- Oluwafemi Balogun (born 1987), Nigerian chess player
- Oluwafemi Olaiya Balogun (born 1953), Nigerian academic
- Oluwafemi Ilesanmi (born 1991), English footballer
- Oluwafemi Oladejo (born 2003), American football player
- Oluwafemi Oyeleye (born 1994), Nigerian boxer
- Oluwafemi Seriki (born 2003), English footballer
- Adenrele Oluwafemi Edun (born 1981), Nigerian television presenter
- Alice Oluwafemi Ayo, Nigerian Paralympian weightlifter
- Joseph Oluwafemi Arulefela, Anglican Bishop of Ikale-Ilaje
- Mark Oluwafemi Williams (born 2001), American basketball player
- Israel Mobolaji Temitayo Odunayo Oluwafemi Owolabi Adesanya (born 1989), Nigerian professional mixed martial artist, New Zealand former kickboxer and boxer
- Anthony Oluwafemi Olaseni Joshua (born 1989), British-Nigerian professional boxer

== See also ==
- Akinbode Oluwafemi, Nigerian environmental activist
- Femi, a list of people with the name
