= Teknonymy =

Practice of referring to parents by the names of their children

Teknonymy (from Ancient Greek: τέκνον 'child' and ὄνομα 'name') is the practice of referring to parents by the names of their children. This practice can be found in many different cultures around the world. The term was coined by anthropologist Edward Burnett Tylor in an 1889 paper. Such names are called teknonyms, teknonymics, or paedonymics.

== Examples ==
Teknonymy can be found in:

- Various Austronesian peoples:
  - The Cocos Malays of Cocos (Keeling) Islands, where parents are known by the name of their first-born child. For instance, a man named Hashim and his wife, Anisa, have a daughter named Sheila. Hashim is now known as Pak Sheila (literally 'Sheila's father') and Anisa as Mak Sheila ('Sheila's mother').
  - Toba Batak people of Indonesia. The case is very similar to the Cocos Malays.
  - Balinese people of Indonesia.
  - Dayak and related indigenous peoples of Borneo, like the Penan
  - Betsileo people of Madagascar, in particular the Zafimaniry subgroup
  - language of the Madurese people of Indonesia
  - Mentawai people of Indonesia
  - Tao people of Taiwan
- the Korean language; for example, if a Korean woman has a child named Su-min, she might be called Su-min Eomma (meaning 'mother of Su-min')
- the Chinese language has a similar but also very flexible phenomenon. Suppose a boy's nickname at home is 二儿 (Er'er), then the father of the child can call the child's mother 他妈/孩儿他妈/二儿他妈, meaning 'his mom'/'child's mom'/'Er'er's mom', respectively. Similar applies to the boy's mother calling her husband (i.e., the boy's father) by changing 妈 ('mom') to 爸/爹 ('dad'). This usage occurs mostly between parents, but can also be found in other limited scenarios, e.g. a teacher calling a child's parents.
- Bangladeshi people
- the Arabic-speaking world; for example, if a Saudi man named Hasan has a male child named Zayn, Hasan will now be known as Abu Zayn (literally 'father of Zayn'). Similarly, Umm Malik (Malik is a name used for males) is 'mother of Malik'. This is known as a kunya in Arabic and is used as a sign of respect for others.
- areas of Amazonia
- the Zuni language, indigenous to New Mexico
- various African peoples, particularly in West Africa
  - the Nupe people of Nigeria; for example, if a man has a son named Isyaku, he will be known as Baba Isyaku, whereas his wife would be called Nna Isyaku.
  - the Yoruba language of West Africa; for example, if a woman has a son named Femi, she will now be known as iya Femi (meaning 'mother of Femi') and her husband baba Femi (meaning 'father of Femi').
  - the Hausa language of West Africa; for example, if a man has a son named Adam, the man will be known as Baban Adam, while his wife would be called Maman Adam.
  - Swahili, as spoken in Tanzania and Kenya; for example, if a woman has a son named Musa, the woman would be known as Mama Musa. Musa's father would be known as Baba Musa.
  - to some extent, among Habesha people in the Horn of Africa

== See also ==
- Michitsuna no Haha
- Korean name
- Patronymy
