= Akinbode (name) =

Nigerian Yoruba name

Akínbọ̀dé
- Gender: Male
- Language: Yoruba

Origin
- Language: Nigerian
- Meaning: The valiant one has returned
- Region of origin: Southwest

Other names
- Variant form: Olabọ̀dé Oyébọ̀dé
- Short form: Bọ̀dé Akín

Akínbọ̀dé (audio) is a Nigerian Yoruba name meaning "The valiant one arrives/returns", mostly used as a surname and given as a name to a boy child in the Southwestern region of Nigeria. Notable people bearing the name include:

- Akinbode Akinbiyi, Nigerian-British photographer
- Akinbode Oluwafemi, Nigerian environmental activist
