= Rumah =

Rumah means "house" or "home" both in the Indonesian language and Bahasa Melayu. It may also refer to:

- Rumah Gadang, the traditional house of Minangkabau people, Indonesia
- Rumah Lanting, the traditional house of Kalimantan, Indonesia
- Rumah, Riyadh, a governorate and city in Riyadh Region, Saudi Arabia
- Rumah, a weekly Indonesian house tabloid
