= Eduok =

Eduok is a surname. Notable people with the surname include:

- Nsikak Eduok (1947–2021), Nigerian air marshal
- Samuel Eduok (born 1994), Nigerian footballer
