= Zafimaniry =

Betsileo malagasy subgroup

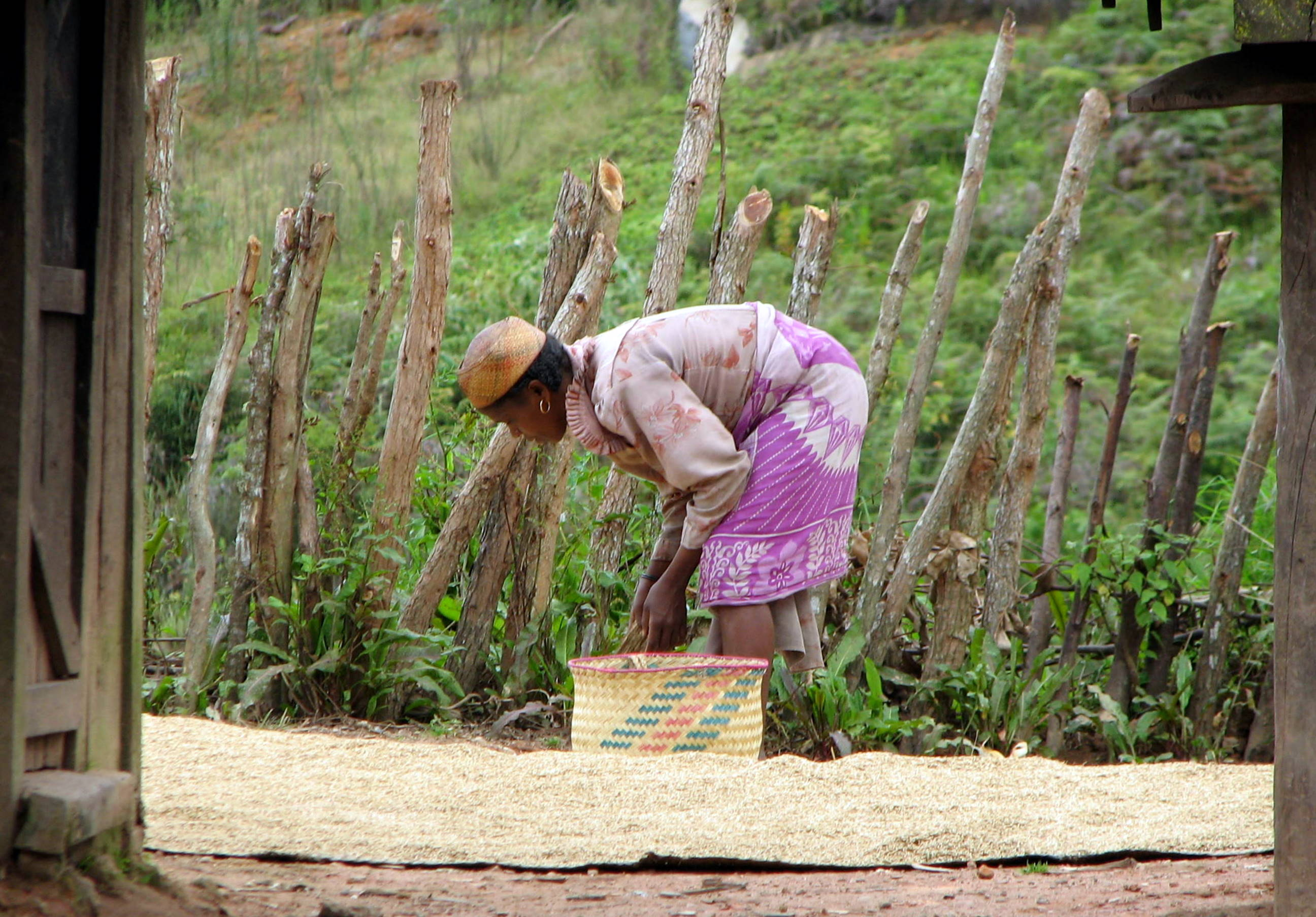
- Zafimaniry woman drying rice

Total population
- c. 15,000

Regions with significant populations
- Madagascar

Languages
- Malagasy and French

Related ethnic groups
- Betsileo; other Malagasy groups; Austronesian peoples

The Zafimaniry are a sub-group of the Betsileo ethnic group of Madagascar. They live in the forested mountains of the southern central highlands southeast of Ambositra, between the neighboring Betsileo and Tanala peoples. There are approximately 100 Zafimaniry villages, which support a population of approximately 25,000. The Zafimaniry speak a dialect of the Malagasy language, which is a branch of the Malayo-Polynesian language group which comes from the Barito languages, that are spoken in southern Borneo.

They are known for their woodcarving knowledge and art, which was added in 2003 to UNESCO's list of the world's Intangible Cultural Heritage. This style of woodworking was once common throughout Madagascar but has decreased because of deforestation. Their art is considered by historians to provide insight into the applied arts of the past in Madagascar.

== Ethnic identity ==
There are an estimated 25,000 Zafimaniry in Madagascar today. The Zafimaniry are descendants of both the Betsimisaraka and Tanala ethnic groups, but are differentiated from both primarily by the nature of the damp and cold mountain forests where they settled. In former Zafimaniry areas where the forest has been lost and terraced rice cultivation has begun, these communities are considered Betsileo by the "real" Zafimaniry who still live in forests and maintain their traditional way of life.

== History ==
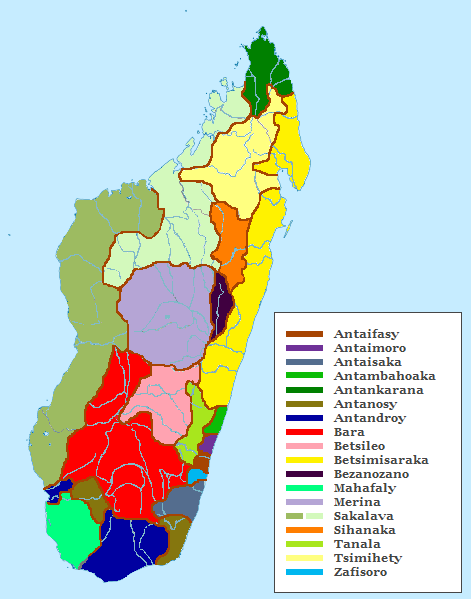
Distribution of Malagasy ethnic groups. Zafimaniry are classified as Betsileo.

The Zafimaniry people migrated to the dense forests of southeastern Madagascar in the 18th century due to increasing deforestation in other parts of the island.

Zafimaniry villages were among those targeted for retaliation by French soldiers during the 1947 Uprising against colonial rule, leading many villagers to flee to the forest where they lived nomadically for two years. The Zafimaniry community was not particularly involved in the uprising but suffered disproportionately because their villages were located along the route taken by major instigator communities in the southeast to reach French encampments in the central highlands, leading the French to believe the Zafimaniry were complicit. As French forces "secured" various portions of Zafimaniry territory, they arrested the local inhabitants and sent them to concentration camps, sometimes burning down the villages as well.

== Society ==
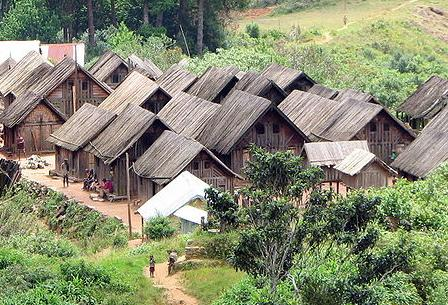
Zafimaniry village

Zafimaniry society is comparatively less hierarchical than that of the Merina people. This has historically manifested as an opposition to centralized government. They are generally non-violent and place a high degree of value on civility and politeness, as well as gentleness in regards to disciplining children.

The climate of Zafimaniry country is highland rainforest, where the weather is often cold and damp. The area sits at an altitude of 1,000-1,800 meters and the weather is usually cloudy, resulting in only around 100 rain-free days per year (2,000-3,000 mm of rain received annually). The largest Zafimaniry town is Antoetra, with a population of around 1000. There are 17 larger Zafimaniry villages, and around 100 in total, although only Antoetra is accessible by car.

=== Family affiliation ===
Monogamous marriage and family life are seen as central to the stability of society. The value placed on this vision of family is symbolically represented in the construction and decorations of Zafimaniry homes. Zafimaniry women tend to marry much earlier than men and become mothers at a young age. By contrast, young men have an extended adolescence during which time they engage in "young men's activities" like hunting and long-distance trading. Young people's pairings are fluid and even a formal marriage can end without complications; it is the birth of children that serves to cement a relationship. Parents are considered more successful as adults when they are able to raise a larger number of children. Older family members (raiamandreny) are respected leaders in the community and set an example of harmonious communal living by speaking calmly and politely with reference to proverbs and the respect due to ancestors.

=== Class affiliation ===
The Zafimaniry historically had a slave class, and although slavery officially ended with French colonization in 1896 (but did not truly end in practice until the mid-1930s), the Zafimaniry still identify descendants of this group as members of the slave class. These members of the slave class, who at most made up 10% of the total population and were generally captives (including foreigners) and disgraced Zafimaniry, were never dispersed throughout Zafimaniry country or owned by individual masters. Rather, they were clustered in just two villages that had a historic role as hosting a sort of court where disputes were resolved, the largest being Antetezandrotra. They served these administrative units by fetching salt from the coast and other such errands but otherwise lived daily lives more or less indistinguishable from the free Zafimaniry. Nonetheless, these two groups do not intermarry. Slaves had no access to land unless it was granted to them by a free Zafimaniry, and this tended to be the exhausted land that free people had allowed to go fallow, where sweet potatoes might still manage to grow.

The free Zafimaniry class is expected to marry other Zafimaniry in order to form social alliances that will provide them with access to new land for cultivation. Since the descendants of slaves could not marry free Zafimaniry to access land, they often choose a spouse from former slave castes in the areas where they migrate for seasonal wage labor. Consequently the descendants of slaves have more relatives outside of Zafimaniry country and are better able to send their children to live with relatives to attend higher quality schools outside Zafimaniry country; the descendants of Zafimaniry slaves are therefore better educated on average than the free Zafimaniry.

=== Religious affiliation ===
Originally, Zafimaniry culture did not have a well defined religion. Traditional beliefs revolved around respect for ancestors and for Zanahary, translated by European missionaries as "God", but representing an indifferent and ever-present force akin to fate or destiny, and manifested through the forces of nature. Beginning in the late 1800s, members of the London Missionary Society began converting free Zafimaniry villages to Protestantism. Jesuit missionaries also conducted heavy outreach to the Zafimaniry in the mid-1930s, particularly including members of the recently freed slave class, who became the primary Catholic converts.

== Culture ==
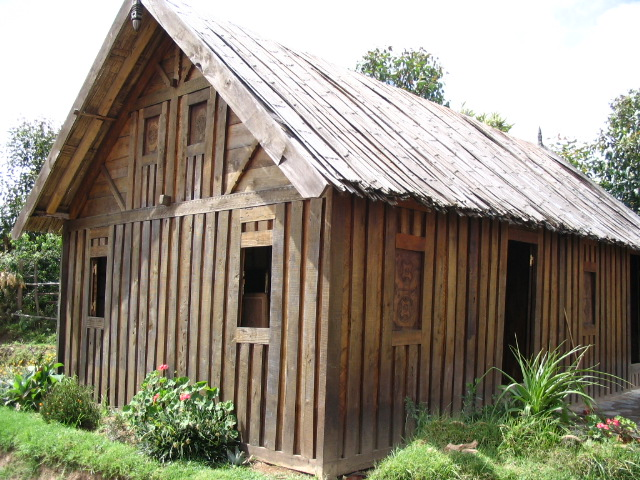
Traditional Zafimaniry wooden house

The Zafimaniry are celebrated for their woodworking skills. Their homes are built entirely of wood without using nails. Houses and all other wooden household items including furniture, tombs and tools are decorated with symbolic geometric patterns that blend Arab and Austronesian influences. Unlike most other ethnic groups in Madagascar, the Zafimaniry place a much greater importance on building houses, rather than tombs, that are durable and well decorated. Fire is applied to harden wood used for the fabrication of blowpipes and arrows. The woodworkers use over 20 types of trees, each with their own specific properties and uses. Their woodworking style was formerly widespread across Madagascar but has largely died out and is now largely preserved only among this ethnic group. In 2008, Zafimaniry woodworking was inscribed on the UNESCO Representative List of the Intangible Cultural Heritage of Humanity.

It is also believed that the Zafimaniry have retained other original Malagasy cultural practices and beliefs that have died out in other parts of the island. For example, there is an association between the circumcision ceremony and death; the child to be circumcised is ritualistically measured for his coffin before the operation is carried out. They also practice the ancient tradition of erecting tall standing stones to commemorate an ancestor or an important event in the ancestor's life. Traditional clothing was made of beaten bark cloth.

=== Funeral rites ===
The dead are entombed in wooden tombs placed in the forest. Ritualized wrestling matches, which often resemble a form of dance, take place at Zafimaniry funeral ceremonies.

=== Dance and music ===
The lokanga is a musical instrument much favored among the Zafimaniry. Its shape is symbolic of a coffin.

== Language ==
The Malagasy language is spoken by Zafimaniry as it is by the rest of the Malagasy ethnic groups. Their dialect is nearly identical to that of the Betsileo, who border them to the west.

== Economy ==
Historically, all community members were woodworkers. However, heavy deforestation has reduced the availability of wood, diminishing the viability of livelihoods based on this skill. In recent years the Zafimaniry villages have increasingly promoted tourism to generate income, but this new form of livelihood is increasingly changing the nature of the communities who were formerly somewhat secluded. Tourism allows them to sell wooden carved handicrafts to passing hikers, and they also sell these items to suppliers who resell them in larger towns like nearby Ambositra. The Catholic former slave class largely monopolized the sale of wooden handicrafts to tourists until the 1970s because the mass production of these items was first organized by local Catholic converts with support from the church; although most Zafimaniry are now involved in this sector, the Catholic ex-slaves still dominate in terms of production, distribution and sale. Zafimaniry also harvest wood from the forest for sale. Most tour guides who organize tourist visits to Zafimaniry villages are from the former slave village of Antetezandrotra.

The Zafimaniry primarily grow maize and beans and have been traditionally reliant on tavy (slash-and-burn agriculture). The average Zafimaniry man spends 22 days a year on clearing agricultural land through tavy, while the remainder of his time can be dedicated to other income earning activities like wood carving or migrating to find seasonal work elsewhere. Maize, which was probably adopted by the Zafimaniry around 200 years ago, is now their staple crop. Fields are burned each year at the start of the planting season, and are cultivated for four to ten years before their fertility is depleted and they are left fallow for around five years before being planted again. As a field becomes less fertile, maize and bean cultivation is abandoned in favor of potatoes and sweet potatoes. Cassava is the last crop to be grown in a field before it is allowed to go fallow During the fallow period, the Zafimaniry use the fields for other purposes, such as for grazing cattle, growing medicinal plants, and growing non-food plants, bushes and trees for fibers and construction material. After seventy years of this fertile-fallow cycle, the Zafimaniry stop cultivating the land plot entirely and allow it to become permanently fallow pasture land. They supplement their corn, taro and beans with wild products gathered in the surrounding forests, particularly including honey and crayfish.

Recent efforts to introduce intensified crop production with an emphasis on rice grown year after year in the same field, have been somewhat successful. Rice cultivation in this historically cold region has been made easier in recent decades due to global warming. This is largely due to the exhaustion of Zafimaniry land for traditional swidden agriculture, which has forced the Zafimaniry to find a way to adopt rice cultivation despite the unadapted nature of the mountainous terrain where they live. The terrain and climate require highly complex terracing and irrigation systems that the local population lacks the knowledge to build, so they are required to hire Betsileo specialists to construct their paddies. Most cash income the Zafimaniry use is invested in the construction of terraces for rice cultivation.

== See also ==
- Antoetra
- World Heritage Sites in Madagascar

== Bibliography ==
- Astuti, Rita; Parry, Jonathan; Stafford, Charles (2007). Questions of Anthropology. Oxford, UK: Berg. ISBN 9781845207489.
- Bloch, Maurice (2010). "Is there religion at Catalhoyuk or are there just houses?". In Hodder, Ian (ed.). Religion in the Emergence of Civilization: Çatalhöyük as a Case Study. New York: Cambridge University Press. pp. 146–162. ISBN 9781139492171.
- Bradt, Hilary; Austin, Daniel (2014). Madagascar (11th ed.). Bucks, UK: Bradt Travel Guides. ISBN 9781841624983.
- Breyer, Thiemo (2007). On the Topology of Cultural Memory: Different Modalities of Inscription and Transmission. Wurzburg, Germany: Königshausen & Neumann. ISBN 9783826035272.
- Bloch, Maurice (1999). "'Eating' young men among the Zafimaniry". In Middleton, Karen (ed.). Ancestors, Power, and History in Madagascar. The Netherlands: Brill. pp. 175–190. ISBN 9789004112896.
- Bloch, Maurice (1995). "Devenir le paysage: La clarté pour les Zafimaniry". In Voisenat, Claudie (ed.). Paysage au pluriel: Pour une approche ethnologique des paysages (in French). Paris: Les Editions de la MSH. pp. 89–104. ISBN 9782735106844.
- Bloch, Maurice (1993). "Domain-specificity, living kinds and symbolism". In Boyer, Pascal (ed.). Cognitive Aspects of Religious Symbolism. Cambridge, UK: Cambridge University Press. pp. 111–120. ISBN 9780521432887.
- Domenichini-Ramiaramanana, Bakoly (1983). Du ohabolana au hainteny: langue, littérature et politique à Madagascar (in French). Paris: Karthala. ISBN 9782865370634.
- Kull, Christian A. (2004). Isle of Fire: The Political Ecology of Landscape Burning in Madagascar. Chicago: University of Chicago Press. ISBN 9780226461403.
- Morris, H.S. (1980). "Slaves, Aristocrats and Export of Sagho in Sarawak". In Watson, James L. (ed.). Asian and African Systems of Slavery. Los Angeles, CA: University of California Press. pp. 293–308. ISBN 9780520040311.
- Nielssen, Hilde (2011). Ritual Imagination: A Study of Tromba Possession Among the Betsimisaraka in Eastern Madagascar. The Netherlands: Brill. ISBN 9789004215245.
