= Banjarese architecture =

Architecture of the Banjar people in Indonesia

While houses dating back to the sultanate of Banjar are rare, the traditional style of architecture of the Banjar people has been adopted by modern architects in South Kalimantan, Indonesia. The most well-known style is the bubungan tinggi, which were originally houses with high, ridged roofs and were occupied by royalty, nobility, and state officials.

Examples of traditional Banjarese religious structures include Candi Laras, Candi Agung, and Masjid Sultan Suriansyah.

== Traditional house types ==
Name	Description	Image
Rumah Bubungan Tinggi or Rumah Banjar or Rumah Ba-anjung	The most iconic type of house in South Kalimantan. In the old kingdom time, this house was the core building in a complex of a palace, where the King and his family would reside. Since 1850, there are various buildings around it with their own respective functions. The name "Bubungan Tinggi" refers to its sharp roof (45 degrees steep). This type of house became so popular, that people out of the royalty also took interest in building it. Hence, there are houses with this type of architecture all over South Kalimantan, and even crossing the borders of Central Kalimantan and East Kalimantan. This type of house, of course, took more money than the usual house, so it was naturally the house of the rich. It is the main figure in both South Kalimantan and Banjarmasin's coat of arms. Many of the modern governmental buildings are built with its traits.	Rumah Bubungan Tinggi
Gajah Baliku	The traditional type of house of the Banjar people. In the old kingdom time, Gajah Baliku was a part of the palace complex. This particular style of house was intended for the closest relatives of the ruler.	
Gajah Manyusu	A type of traditional house of Banjar people which was the house of the nobles ("Pagustian", the ones who bore the title of "Gusti").	Rumah Gajah Manyusu di Birayang
Balai Laki	A type of traditional house of the Banjar people. In the time of the old kingdom, this house was a part of the palace complex. Rumah Balai Laki was the house for officials such as the ministers.	a "Dahi Lawang", the ventilation above the window of a Balai Laki
Balai Bini	Part of a Banjarese palace complex. Balai Bini was the house of the ladies of the court, such as the princesses and nannies.	Balai Bini type of house in Benua Anyar
Palimbangan	Part of the palace complex, Palimbangan was the house for high clerics and big merchants.	
Palimasan (Rumah Gajah)	The distinctive feature of this house is its "shield roof". In the old kingdom time, it is a part of the palace complex. Its function in the complex was to be used as a treasury.You can still see old houses with this style in South Kalimantan, but they are usually not in a very good condition.	"Kandangrasi" fence of a Palimasan house
Anjung Surung (Rumah Cacak Burung)	Traditional house of commoners. The shape of this house if seen from above is the shape of a cross(+), that is why it is also known as Rumah Cacak Burung.	
Tadah Alas	Traditional house of Banjar people.	
Rumah Lanting	A type of traditional house of the Banjar people, where the foundation is a raft made from big logs of wood floats on the rivers of South Kalimantan. This raft is made from big logs of wood.	
Rumah Joglo Gudang or Rumah Bulat	This type of house has the roof that is similar to Javanese-style house, Joglo, hence the name. While the name "Gudang" (which means "storehouse) was given because the lower part of the house is usually used to store things. This feature makes this type of house is the preferred style of ethnic Chinese people living in South Kalimantan.	Mahligai Pancasila, a government-owned building with Joglo Gudang-inspired style A house in Joglo Gudang style in Kampung Pacinan Laut, Kelurahan Gedang, Banjarmasin
Bangun Gudang	Traditional house of the Banjar people.	

== See also ==
- Architecture of Indonesia
