= Femi John Femi =

Air Vice-Marshal Femi John Femi

Chief of Air Staff, Nigerian Air Force
- In office 17 September 1992 – 30 March 1996
- Preceded by: AVM. Akin Dada
- Succeeded by: AM. Nsikak Eduok

Personal details
- Born: 30 December 1945 (age 80) Egbeda–Kabba, Kogi State, Nigeria

Military service
- Allegiance: Nigeria
- Branch/service: Nigerian Air Force
- Years of service: 1965-1996
- Rank: Air Vice-Marshal
- Commands: Training Command; Nigerian Air Force

Femi John Femi (born 30 December 1945) is Nigeria's first qualified helicopter pilot to be appointed as the Chief of Air Staff of the Nigerian Air Force.

== Early life ==
Femi was born on 30 December 1945 in Egbeda–Kabba, Kogi State. He enlisted into the NAF as an officer cadet on 1 July 1965. He proceeded to Germany for his pilot training after his basic military training. He qualified as a helicopter pilot in March 1967 and was commissioned Second Lieutenant on his return to Nigeria on 1 June 1967.

== Air force career ==
Femi enlisted into the NAF as an officer cadet on 1 July 1965. He proceeded to Germany for his pilot training after his basic military training. He qualified as a helicopter pilot in March 1967 and was commissioned Second Lieutenant on his return to Nigeria on 1 June 1967.

Other courses attended by Air Vice Marshal Femi include a flying training course on the Alouette helicopter at Ikeja in 1973; a conversion course on the DO-27 in Kaduna in 1973; a flying course on the BO-105 helicopter in Germany in 1974; a senior management course in Aerospace Systems at the University of Southern Carolina USA in 1974; and a conversion course on the Puma helicopter in France in 1975. In 1978 he attended an operations and tactical course before attending the Armed Forces Command and Staff College, Jaji in 1979. He attended the prestigious USAF Air War College in 1982 where he received an award for excellence. Air Vice Marshal Femi held various appointments at both command and staff levels in the NAF. He had Civil War attachments at Makurdi, Enugu, Umunede, Asaba, Port-Harcourt, and Escravos. He was also involved in the airlift of relief materials to all the Local Government Areas in the defunct Eastern Region with Arizona Helicopters, Inc between March and August 1970. He was the Group Safety Officer at ATG and Director of Training at the NAF Headquarters on 2 occasions (May 1975-April 1977 and May 1980-December 1981

He also, at various times, commanded 301 FTS, 305 FTS and NAF Port Harcourt. He was appointed the Senior Air Staff Officer, HQ TAC between August 1987 and February 1988. He moved to the Military Airlift Command, Ibadan in 1989 where he served in the same capacity. He was posted to HQ NAF as Air Officer Inspections in 1991. From December 1991 to 1993, he served at the National War College, first as a Member of the Establishment Committee, then as a Senior Directing Staff and then as Acting Deputy Commandant and Director of Studies. On 17 September 1993 he was appointed Chief of Air Staff of the NAF. He retired from military service in 1996

== Personal life ==
Femi is married to Victoria and has six children.

Military offices
Preceded by Akin Dada	Chief of the Air Staff (NAF); 1993 – 1996	Succeeded by Nsikak-Abasi Essien Eduok
