= Olufemi =

Olufemi is a surname. Notable people with the surname include:

- John Olufemi (born 1984), Nigerian football (soccer) player
- Lola Olufemi, British feminist writer
- Oladapo Olufemi (born 1988), Nigerian football (soccer) player
- Tosin Olufemi (born 1994), English footballer

== See also ==
- Olufela Olufemi Anikulapo Kuti, known as Femi Kuti (born 1962), Nigerian musician
- Olúfẹ́mi O. Táíwò, Nigerian-American philosopher
- Olufemi Terry, Sierra Leonean writer
- Femi
