= Corporate Accountability and Public Participation Africa =

Corporate Accountability and Public Participation Africa, also known as CAPPA, is a Nigerian non-governmental organisation that advocates for corporate accountability, public participation in governance, water justice, and public health policy.

== History and advocacy ==
On 16 March 2025, CAPPA warned that handing over public water facilities like the Adiyan II Water Treatment Plant, to private entities would expose Lagosians to higher tariffs, restricted access, and corporate exploitation. After the Lagos State Government signed a Memorandum of Understanding signed with the Belstar/ENKA consortium to rehabilitate and expand the state's water infrastructure, CAPPA criticized the selection process for lack of transparency in May 2025.

CAPPA has also campaigned for a reformed mining policy to make licensing processes accessible and affordable for local communities and small-scale miners. It has also spoken against foreign miners monopolising lithium mining in Nigeria.

The organisation has frequently called for stiffer penalties for violations of smoking regulations for public safety. CAPPA petitioned the National Assembly on 21 January 2025 to increase the budgetary allocation for tobacco control from ₦10 million to ₦300 million in the 2025 national budget. It has also advocated for an increase in tax on sugar sweetened beverages.

CAPPA organised a journalist training in April 2024 in Lagos on salt reduction, urging implementation of mandatory salt targets and public education campaigns to lower sodium intake, which at the time averaged 5.8 grams per day and contributing to cardiovascular disease risk.
