= Bubungan Tinggi =

Type of house in southern Borneo

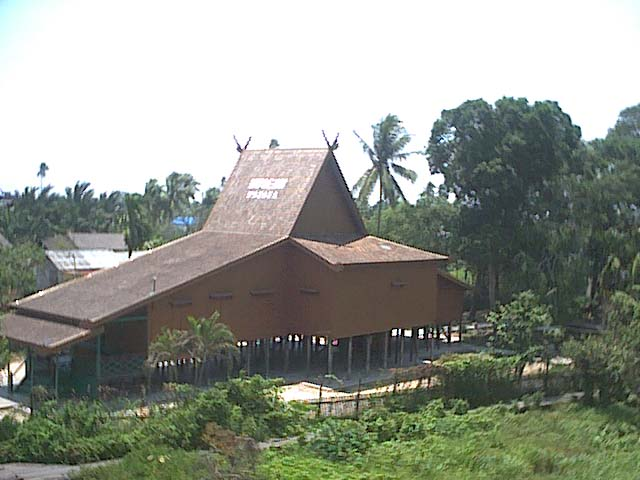

Rumah Bubungan Tinggi or Rumah Banjar or Rumah Ba-anjung is an iconic type of house in South Kalimantan. Its name Bubungan Tinggi refers to the steep roof (45 degrees). It is one of the Banjarese House types. In the old kingdom time, this house was the core building within a palace complex, where the King and his family resided. Since 1850, there were various buildings added around it with their own respective functions. Later this type of house became so popular, that people which were not part of the royalty also took interest in building it.

Today, there are houses of this type of architecture all over South Kalimantan, and even crossing the borders of Central Kalimantan and East Kalimantan. Due to ancient ties between this region and the island of Madagascar a similar style can be observed in some parts of that island. As it is more expensive than a usual house, it is only affordable for the more wealthy people.

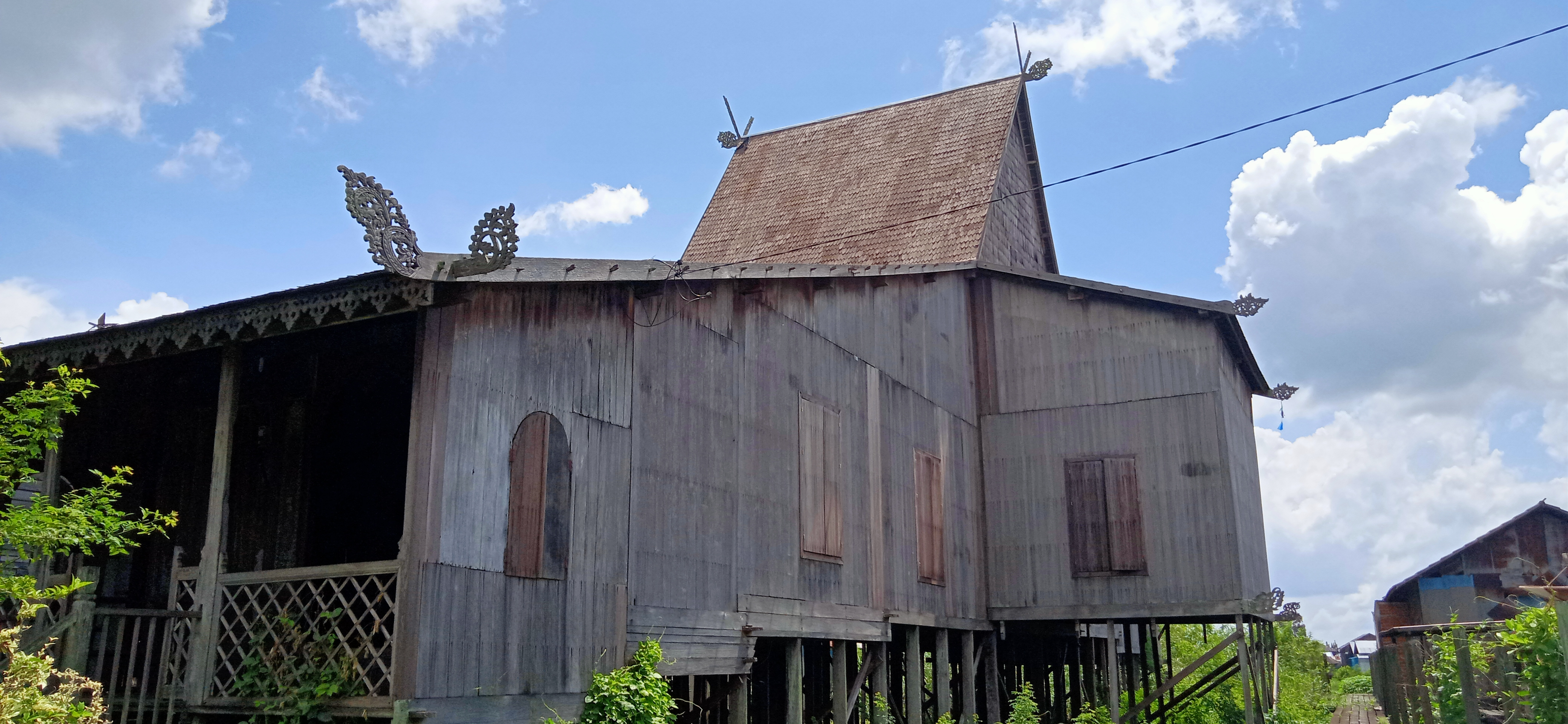

== Construction elements ==
The main construction elements of the Rumah Bubungan Tinggi are:

- The main building part in the middle.
- Anjung, the constructions on the right (Anjung Kanan) and the left side (Anjung Kiwa) of the central part.
- The central part of the roof that is very steep, the Bubungan Tinggi.
- Front roof is Sindang Langit, rear roof is called Hambin Awan.

== Rooms ==
- Palatar, the front room which is the first room someone would encounter after climbing the stairs
- Panampik Kacil, a small room after someone enters Lawang Hadapan (front door). The floor is higher than Palatar. This floor border is called Watun Sambutan.
- Panampik Tangah, a bigger room than Panampik Kacil, with a higher floor. The floor border is called Watun Jajakan.
- Panampik Basar or Ambin Sayup, the in oppose of the Tawing Halat (middle wall), with an even higher floor. The floor border is called the same thing with the Panampik Tangah, Watun Jajakan.
- Palidangan or Ambin Dalam, the inner part of the house which borders the Panampik Basar. The floor is the same height with Panampik Basar (but in some houses, the floor of Panampik Basar is lower than Palidangan’s). The border is called Watun Langkahan. In this room is the large pillars that hold the Bubungan Tinggi (there are 8 of them). These pillars are called Tihang Pitugur or Tihang Guru.
- Panampik Dalam or Panampik Bawah is a quite large room with floor lower than Palidangan’s and has the same height with Panampik Tangah. The border of this floor is called Watun Jajakan.
- Padapuran or Padu, the last room in the rear. The floor is lower than Panampik Bawah. The floor border is called Watun Juntaian. This part of the house is used for kitchening. Atangan part is the part for cooking, Salaian part is for drying the woods use for cooking, Pajijiban and Pagaduran are the parts for dishwashing and laundrying.

== Ornaments ==
Carvings decorate fundamental parts such as the pillars, the stair railings, etc. Banjarese-style decoration are strongly influenced by Islam which forbids the depiction of human or animal. So the common motives are floral. There are motives that incorporates features of naga and other mystical animals, but they are stylized in a way of floral form.

== Contemporary use ==
Nowadays most Banjar people have little interest in building Bubungan Tinggi. Beside the fact that it is expensive to build, people prefer the "modern" type of house. Its cultural values, however, are still appreciated. It is the main figure in both South Kalimantan and Banjarmasin's coat of arms. Many of the modern governmental buildings are built with its traits.

== Gallery ==
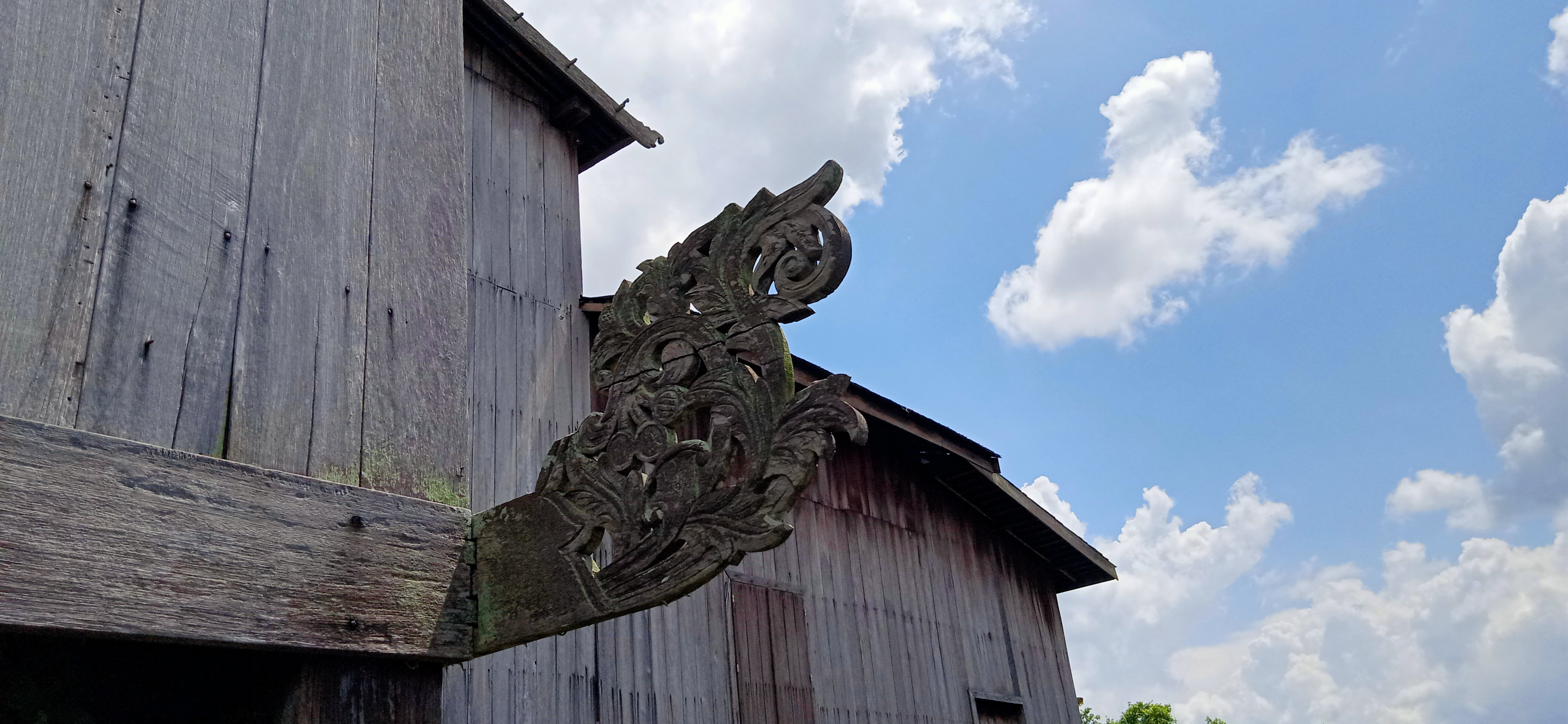

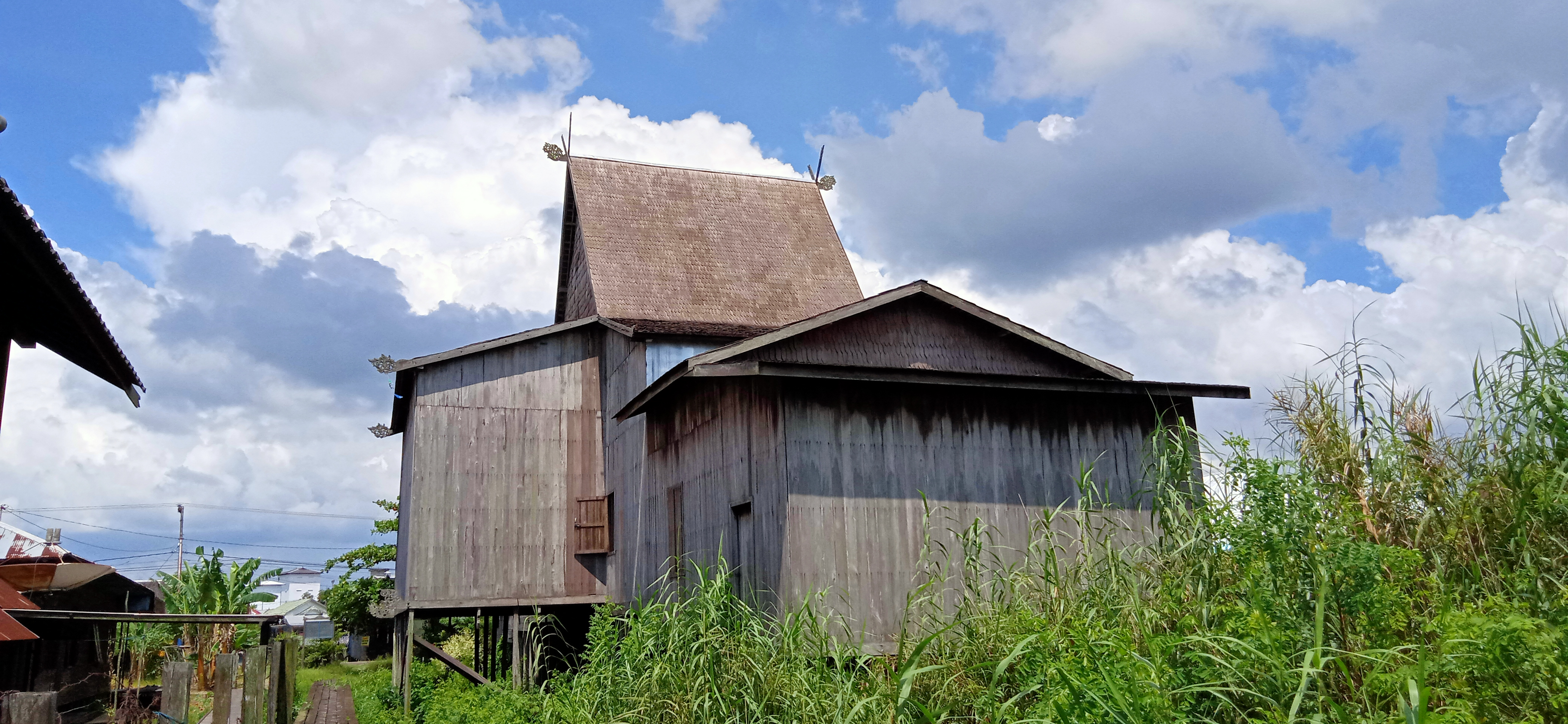

== See also ==
- Indonesian architecture
