= Akinbode Oluwafemi =

Nigerian activist

- Occupations: environmental; Activist; Social justice campaigner and tobacco control advocate.
- Notable work: He was the Deputy Director of Environmental Rights Action/Friends of the Earth Nigeria (ERA/FoEN).

Akinbode Oluwafemi is a Nigerian environmental activist, Social justice campaigner, and tobacco control advocate. He was the Deputy Director of Environmental Rights Action/Friends of the Earth Nigeria (ERA/FoEN). He is a recipient of the 2009 Bloomberg Awards for Global Tobacco Control. The award ceremony was held at the 14th World Conference on Tobacco or Health held in Mumbai, India. He is the Executive Director at Corporate Accountability and Public Participation Africa (CAPPA), where he has over two decades experience in grassroots organising, policy advocacy and building strong coalitions.

== Career ==
Akinbode Matthew Oluwafemi, is a social equity advocate who has over twenty years of experience in journalism, public relations, and social promotion. He currently serves as the Deputy Executive Director of Environmental Rights Action/Friends of the Earth, Nigera (ERA/FoEN), which is Nigeria's leading environmental rights lobbying organization.

Oluwafemi takes charge of ERA/FoEN's Tobacco Control and Water Campaign. He has been actively involved in various tobacco control initiatives in the African region. Before joining ERA/FoEN, Oluwafemi was a journalist with The Guardian, which is Nigeria's top national newspaper. As a journalist, he played an active role in the press freedom struggles, during the dictatorial rule of the late General Sani Abacha. Over the past few years, he has been putting his energy into constructing the "Our Water, Our Right Coalition," which is challenging water privatization in Lagos and throughout Nigeria.

He became a member of the steering committee for the Network for Accountability of Tobacco Transnationals (NATT).

== Awards ==
Akinbode has been rewarded the Bloomberg Award for Global Tobacco Control
