= Nsikak Eduok =

Nigerian air marshal (1947–2021)

Air Marshal Nsikak-Abasi Essien Eduok

Chief of Air Staff, Nigerian Air Force
- In office 30 March 1996 – 29 May 1999
- Preceded by: AVM. Femi John Femi
- Succeeded by: AM. Isaac Mohammed Alfa

Personal details
- Born: 11 July 1947 Ibesikpo Asutan, Akwa Ibom State, Nigeria
- Died: 6 January 2021 (aged 73)

Military service
- Allegiance: Nigeria
- Branch/service: Nigerian Air Force
- Rank: Air Marshal

Nsikak-Abasi Essien Eduok (11 July 1947 – 6 January 2021) was the Chief of the Air Staff of the Nigerian Air Force between 1996 and 1999.

== Early life ==
Nsikak Eduok was born to the family of Essien Eduok of Mbak in Ibesikpo Asutan local government in Akwa Ibom State.

== Career ==
Nsikak Eduok after his education began working for VON for a short while as a studio manager. In 1968 Nsikak enrolled in the NAF as a probable pilot. Air Marshal Nsikak Eduok obtained his first military exercise from the Nigerian Defence Academy before going for his principal flying training in 1970. In 1971 after completing his principal training he went through the Basic Flying training course and emerged the best overall student. In that same year he was assigned Second Lieutenant. Between 1971 and 1986 he attended several flying courses which included an Advanced and Tactical Flying training course, Aircraft Accident Investigation course, MiG-21 Conversion Course in the Soviet Union, and Advanced Staff Course in United Kingdom.

In 1991, he attended USAF Air War College in Alabama where he graduated in 1992. Between 1975 and 1976, Nsikak Eduok was the first Operations Officer of the Makurdi Strike Group . He was the Commanding Officer of NAF Station, Enugu and the first Commander of the 75th Fighter Squadron.

Nsikak Eduok also has a street "Nsikak Eduok Avenue" in Akwa Ibom named after him by the past governor of the state.

Nsikak Eduok died on 6 January 2021.

== Awards ==
- National, Defence, Independence and Republic Medals
- Distinguished Service Star and the Meritorious Service Star Medals
