= Arizona Helicopters =

American helicopter contractor

Arizona Helicopters Inc was a helicopter contractor which operated in Laos in the early 1970s for the Central Intelligence Agency.

Arizona Helicopters was originally based out of Chandler Municipal Airport in Chandler, Arizona and then in 1968 was moved to Scottsdale Airport in Scottsdale, Arizona. Scottsdale Airport Fixed Base Operator, Robert Wachs, owned and operated Arizona Helicopters Inc. The company assisted in fire fighting operations, flying Santa Claus to malls for the Wallace and Ladmo Show in Phoenix, Arizona, and other charters.

== Fleet ==
The Arizona Helicopters fleet consisted of 50 helicopters, across the following 6 aircraft types:

- Bell 47
- Bell 205A-1
- Bell 206 JetRanger II
- Bell 212
- Fairchild Hiller FH-1100
- Sud Aviation SA.318C Alouette Astazou

== See also ==
- List of defunct airlines of the United States
