= Femi =

Fẹ́mi
- Gender: Unisex
- Language: Yoruba

Origin
- Origin: Nigerian
- Meaning: Love me
- Region of origin: South-West Nigeria

Fẹ́mi audio is a common Nigerian given unisex name of Yoruba origin which means "love me". Femi is most commonly a diminutive form of "Olufemi" (or Olúfẹ́mi) which means The Lord loves me ,("Olú" means Lord, Leader, or the "Prominent one," in the Yoruba language). Olufemi can also be diminutive of Olúwafẹ́mi. Other full forms of the name include Olorunfemi (God loves me), Jesufemi (Jesus loves me), Nifemi (Have my love), Babafemi (Father loves me), Obafemi (The King loves me), Adefemi (Royalty loves me), Ifafemi (Ifa loves me) etc.

Femi is also an occasional surname. Notable people bearing the name include

== Given name ==
=== Acting ===
- Femi Branch, Nigerian actor, director and politician
- Femi Taylor, British dancer and actress
- Femi Emiola, American actress
- Femi Oyeniran, British actor

=== Politics ===
- Femi Fani-Kayode (born 1960), Nigerian politician
- Femi Gbaja Biamila (born 1962), Nigerian politician
- Femi Oluwole (born 1990), British political activist
- Femi Pedro (born 1955), Nigerian politician
- Femi Okurounmu, Nigerian politician, Senator for Ogun Central
- Femi Adesina, Nigerian journalist and government official
- Obafemi Awolowo, Nigerian politician, statesman, and nationalist who played a key role in Nigeria's independence movement.

=== Sport ===
- Femi, nickname of Oluwafemi Ajilore (born 1985), footballer now playing for FC Groningen
- Femi Ilesanmi (born 1991), English professional footballer
- Femi Joseph (born 1990), Nigerian footballer now playing for Liberty Professionals F.C.
- Femi Opabunmi (born 1985), footballer now playing for Shooting Stars FC
- Femi Orenuga (born 1993), English footballer now playing for Everton

=== Writing and journalism ===
- Femi Osofisan (born 1946), Nigerian writer
- Femi Euba, Nigerian actor and playwright
- Femi Oguns, British playwright
- Femi Oke (born 1966), British TV journalist, now in New York

=== Law ===
- Femi Falana, Nigerian Lawyer and human rights activist.

=== Other ===
- Femi Otedola (born 1967), Nigerian billionaire businessman
- Femi Kuti (born 1962), Nigerian musician and the eldest son of afrobeat pioneer Fela Kuti
- Femi John Femi (born 1945), Chief of Air Staff of the Nigerian Air Force
- Femi Temowo, British jazz musician

== Surname ==
- Caleb Femi, British poet and former young people's laureate for London
- Cesare Femi, 18th century Italian painter
- Femi John Femi (born 1945), Nigerian pilot
- Oba Femi, ring name of the Nigerian professional wrestler Isaac Odugbesan

== See also ==
- La Fémis the National School of Image and Sound Professions
