= Alice Oluwafemi Ayo =

Nigerian powerlifter

- Occupation: Nigerian paralympian
- Notable work: Broke the world record for World Para Powerlifting Championships in Mexico and in Dubai.

Alice Oluwafemi Ayo, a Nigerian paralympian who broke the world record for World Para Powerlifting Championships in Mexico and in Dubai.

== Career ==
On 2 December 2017, she emerged the winner during the Championship competition in Mexico after lifting 140 kg in her first three attempt and on the fourth attempt, she broke the world record of 144 kg her compatriot set in 2014 with a 145 kg lift.

In January 2018, at the 9th Fazza World Para Powerlifting World Cup in Dubai, she broke her own record by a one kilogram and she made an attempt to lift 149 kg and failed.
