= Aloalo =

Madagascar funeral sculpture

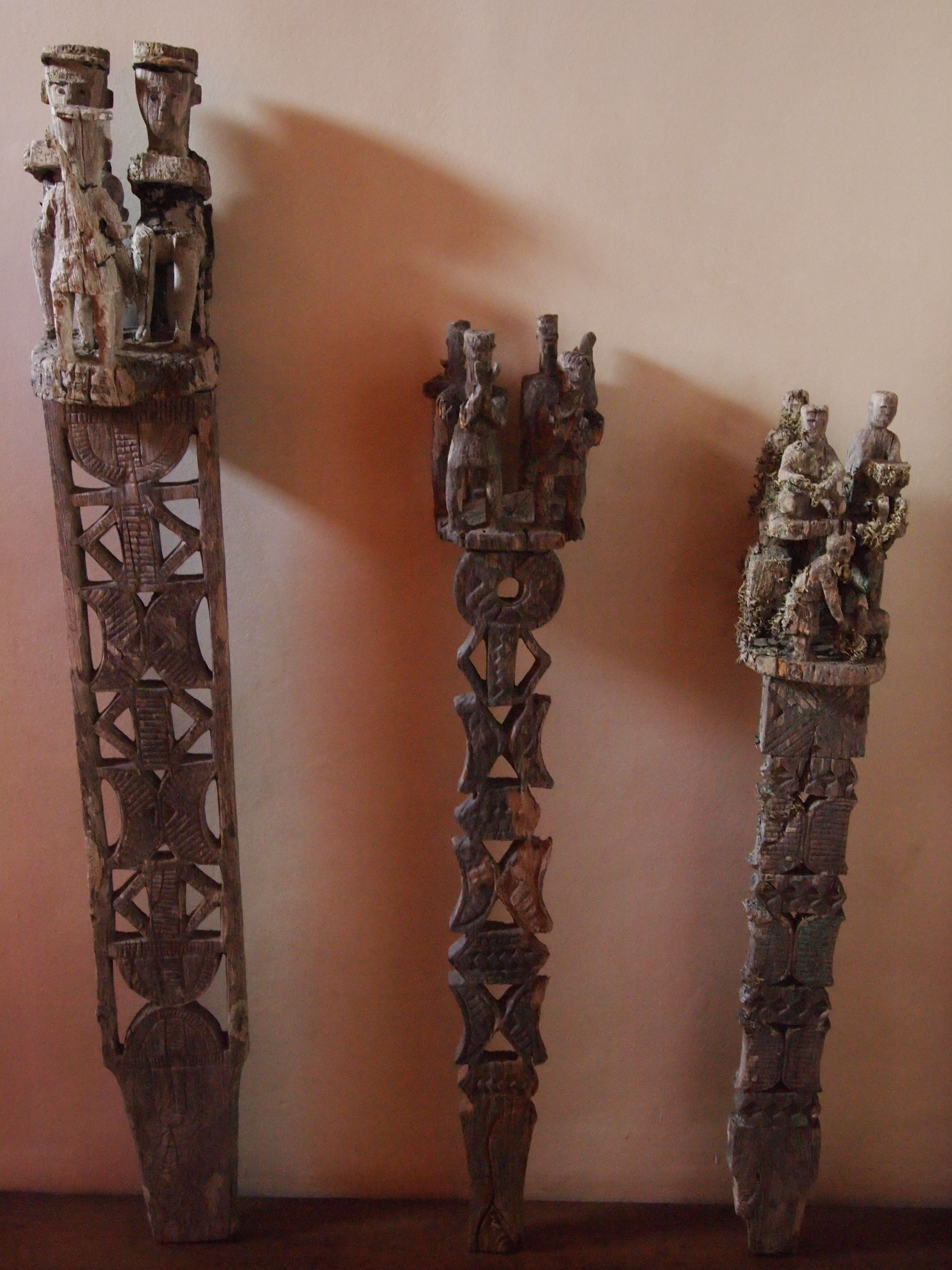
Three antique aloalo

The aloalo is a funerary pole sculpture that, along with the skulls of slaughtered zebu, is placed on the tombs of important people in the south-western region of Madagascar. Originally, aloalos were only available for wealthy individuals, but later the wealthy could purchase them. The memorial may help the deceased to join the community of ancestors, since the word alo means 'intermediary' or 'messenger' in Malagasy. These carved posts often tell the story of the person's life and generally take the form of a series of geometric or symbolic shapes topped by sculpted figures or objects evocative of the deceased's life, or desirable material possessions. The zebu represents prosperity and the aloalo usually has a combination of nude human figures and birds. They are chiefly associated with the Mahafaly people, although they are also found on the tombs of some Antandroy and particularly the Sakalava, whose carved figures are reputed for their often erotic imagery.

Traditionally, burial sites and aloalos were located outside of villages. After the 1896 French colonization, aloalos were exposed to the rest of the world where aloalos are now often found on the international art market.
