= Tanala =

Malagasy ethnic group

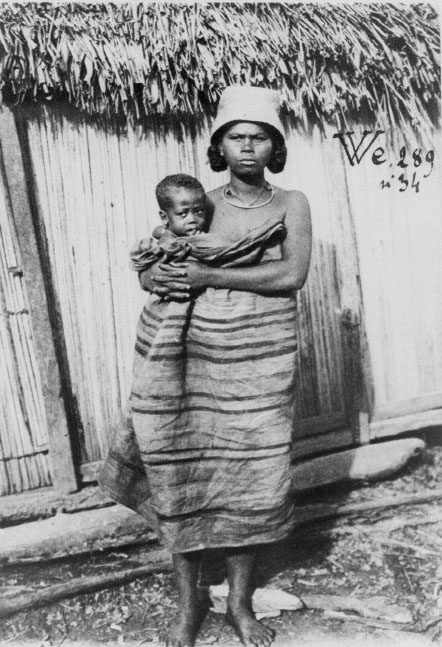
- Tanala woman and child

Total population
- c. 400,000

Regions with significant populations
- Madagascar

Languages
- Antagnala

Related ethnic groups
- Other Malagasy groups; Bantu peoples, Austronesian peoples

The Tanala or Antagnala are a Malagasy ethnic group that inhabit a forested inland region of south-east Madagascar near Manakara. Their name means "people of the forest." Tanala people identify with one of two sub-groups: the southern Ikongo group, who managed to remain independent in the face of the expanding Kingdom of Imerina in the 19th century, or the northern Menabe group, who submitted to Merina rule. Both groups trace their origin back to a noble ancestor named Ralambo, who is believed to be of Arab descent. They were historically known to be great warriors, having led a successful conquest of the neighboring Antemoro people in the 18th century. They are also reputed to have particular talent in divination through reading seeds or through astrology, which was brought to Madagascar with the Arabs.

Tanala social structure is characterized by a harmonious interrelationship between the nobles of the Tanala who migrated into the forest where they settled, and the commoner chiefs of the people who were already settled there. This relationship is traditionally reinforced through marriage between the groups and particular roles given to each in the governance of the community. The Tanala speak a dialect of the Malagasy language and adhere to numerous fady such as a prohibition against visiting a nobleman when he is ill, or closing the door to the house during mealtimes to prevent others from watching one eat. Their main livelihoods are the cultivation of coffee and rice.

== Ethnic identity ==
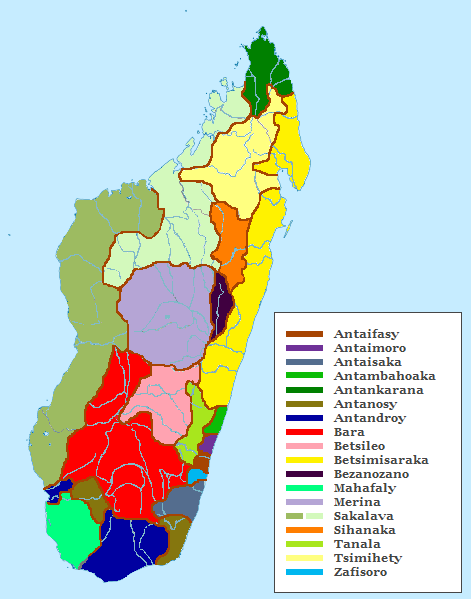
Distribution of Malagasy ethnic groups

The Tanala are a Malagasy ethnic group that inhabit a forested inland region of south-east Madagascar near Manakara bounded on the north by the Faraony river to the north and the Matitanana river to the south. To the east it is cut off 40 km from the coast by a band of Antemoro villages. The altitude in Tanala territory varies between 250 and 600 meters in elevation, except on Mount Ikongo (1,200 meters) in the middle of the territory. They inhabit the southern portion of a massif that abruptly drops along a steep cliff to its east into the coastal rainforest.

In 2013, the Tanala numbered around 400,000 people. Their name means "people of the forest." Several Tanala rulers trace their lineage back to Antaimoro ombiasy (wisemen) who migrated to the area after 1550. Tanala people identify with one of two sub-groups: the southern Ikongo group, who managed to remain independent in the face of the expanding Kingdom of Imerina in the 19th century, or the northern Menabe group, who submitted to Merina rule. The Ikongo group live in the southernmost portion of the massif on fertile land that is easily accessible to neighboring ethnic groups and so has historically been a crossroads of cultures. The Menabe group just north of Ikongo live in the more rocky and mountainous area and have been largely isolated. Most people living in this area are descended from members of other groups who were defeated in local conflicts and were pushed from more desirable land into this inaccessible area, where they could take refuge. Recently, researchers have suggested that the Tanala are not truly a separate ethnic group. They have never been united as a single ethnic nation.

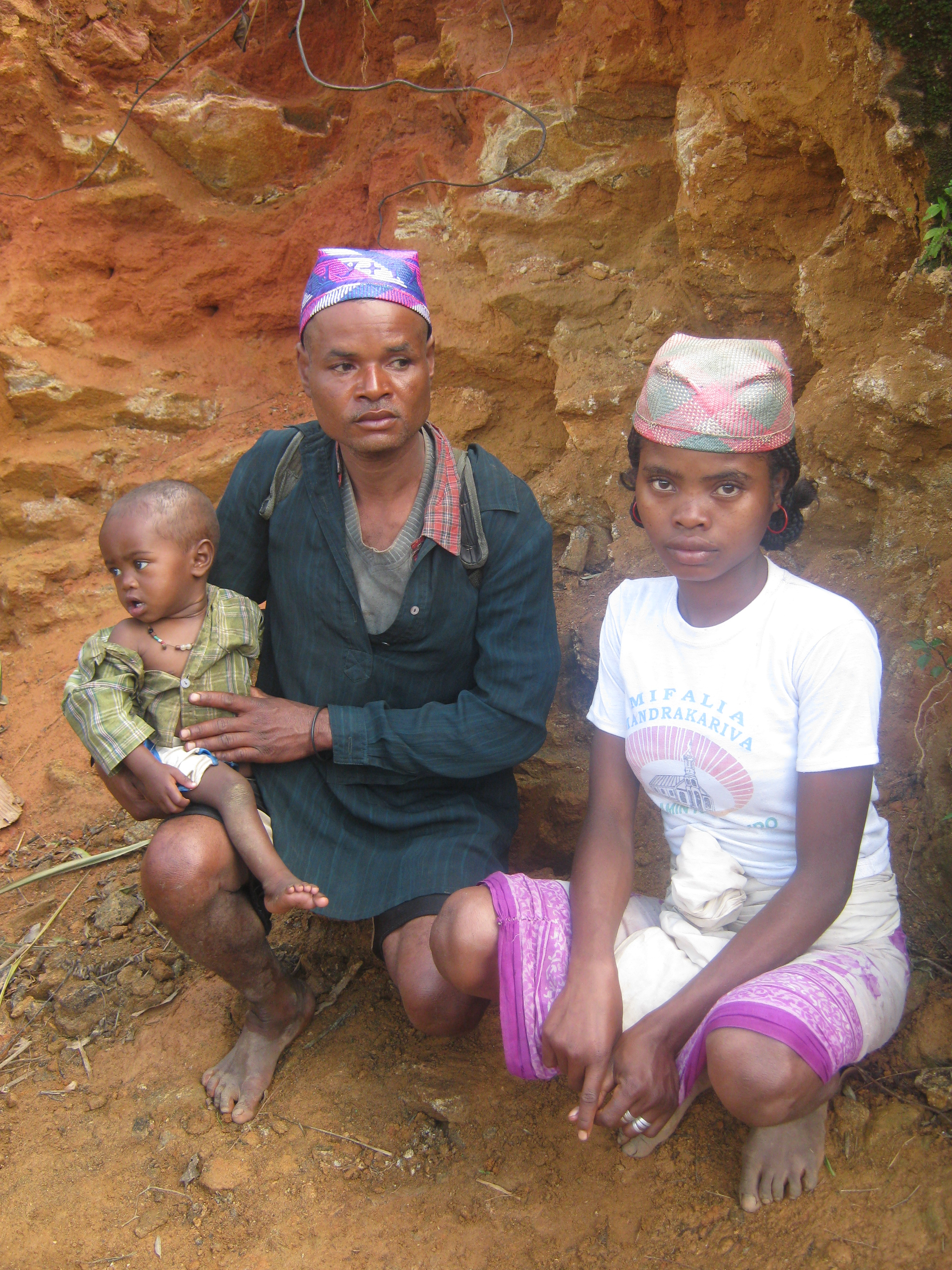
A Tanala family

== History ==
The first settlers of Tanala country were the Vazimba, the island's earliest inhabitants. In the 17th century, the Zafirambo clan migrated into the territory from the southeastern coast. These newcomers traced their origins back to a leader called Rambo, whose gender is disputed in the oral histories. Rambo's parents both belonged to noble clans with Arab origins - the Anteony on the paternal side and the Zafiraminia on the maternal side. The Zafirambo relate that Rambo left Mananjary in the late 16th or early 17th century to settle near Ambositra. Rambo's descendants gradually moved south and then crossed the eastern ridge to settle near Manambondro. In the 18th century groups of Betsileo moved into this territory, including a group of blacksmiths (the Antamby) with whom the Zafirambo formed an alliance.

Over the next 50 years, the Zafirambo expelled the ruling Antemahafaly clan from the Sandrananta and Manambondro valleys and united the commoners of the area under Zafirambo authority. Over much of the 18th century the Tanala were engaged in conflict with the Antemoro, which concluded near the end of the century in a bloody Tanala conquest of the eastern coast. The kingdom achieved its maximum extent (a span of 100 kilometers between the Faraony and Matetana rivers) in the mid-18th century under King Andriamatahetany. Shortly afterward, the kingdom split into two Tanala kingdoms clustered around Manambondro and Sandrananta.

== Society ==
Tanala society was historically divided into nobles, free people and slaves. Although Tanala nobles (mpanjaka) ruled the commoners, they were assisted by an advisor (anakandriana) who was a commoner, and consulted the commoners' elders (zoky olo). The king was accountable to his people, who had the power to remove him from his position of leadership. In addition, members of Tanala communities regardless of class consulted ombiasy (wise men) of the Antemoro tribe who served as diviners, holders of arcane knowledge and advisers to the noble class across the island. Kings and their sons enjoyed certain privileges; only a king could carry a red parasol (a mark of nobility) and sat upon a throne made of several woven mats rolled together. Only he and his sons were allowed to wear silver bracelets around their wrists and ankles and silver necklaces, and these were only worn on festival days. When a nobleman fell sick, it was forbidden for anyone to enter the sick prince's home, and any medicines had to be slipped into the house by a messenger. The homes of nobles were distinguished by affixing zebu horns or crossed and carved wooden stakes in the shape of zebu horns to both ends of the roof peak. Nobles frequently married with powerful commoner families to establish political alliances for greater influence and the stability and security of their territory. After their death, relics (lambohamba) of nobles were sometimes kept and would be ritually bathed as part of an annual celebration held at a particular location in the Sandrananta valley.

The social structures of the two major Tanala sub-groups had minor variations. Among the Tanala-Zafirambo, society was divided into the privileged class (fotsy, "white") and the commoners (mainty, "black"). The fotsy practiced rice cultivation, whereas the mainty grew tubers.

Traditionally, the Tanala adhered to trial by ordeal to determine the guilt or innocence of an accused party. This typically consisted of requiring the accused to swim from one bank of a river to the other and back; if attacked by a crocodile, the party was considered guilty. If found innocent, the accuser was forced to pay a fine of four zebu, of which two were given to the accused and the two others went to the king and his advisor.

=== Family affiliation ===
A number of ritual practices and beliefs are associated with birth among the Tanala. In the past, after delivery of a baby the mother would wash her hands in the blood of a freshly sacrificed chicken, bathe herself in hot water, and then rest upright beside a fire to make her sweat out impurities. The period that she needed to stay beside the fire varied; noblewomen might stay beside the fire for as long as several months, but more commonly the duration was eight days. Immediately after this period beside the fire was concluded, a party was held, which the mother had to attend regardless of her condition; the event was marked by the slaughter of zebu. Immediately after birth, the baby would be bathed in cold water, and a sorcerer would declare certain days to be lifelong fady (taboo days); if a baby was born on a day that was fady for both the mother and father, the child would be abandoned to die. In addition, there are eight fady days per month for all Tanala, and historically if a child was born on one of these days, it would be drowned by holding its head in a water-filled winnowing pan.

== Culture ==
The Tanala were known to be great warriors, and also had a reputation for divination using astronomy and the reading of seeds. In Tanala country, each village near a river would enclose a portion of the bank with stakes to protect women and children from crocodiles when fetching water. It is traditional to close the door to the house during mealtimes to prevent outsiders from seeing the family eat.

Traditionally, all Tanala men and women regardless of social class wore clothing made from woven or beaten mats made from harefo reeds (Eleocharis plantagines). Mat clothing (tafitsihy) for women consisted of several rectangular pieces stitched together into a tube that was worn drawn up at the shoulder or belted at the waist, while men wore a beaten bark loincloth and a mat jacket or tunic with longer sleeves for older men.

=== Fady ===
Circumcision is an important ritual among the Tanala, as in many other Malagasy ethnic groups. A range of fady are associated with the practice, particularly for nobles. A noble Tanala mother became subject to a new range of fady after the circumcision of her son. She was thereafter forbidden to take her son for a walk, eat on her own bed or in secret, or consume dried meat of any kind or the meat of a zebu that had been slaughtered (as opposed to having died of natural causes). If she broke any of these taboos, or if the child urinated or defecated during the circumcision ceremony, the child would lose his noble status (an older fady previously required that the child be put to death in such cases).

Among certain Tanala communities, the Indri lemur (babakoto) is considered sacred and is protected by a range of fady. For instance, they cannot be killed or eaten, and if captured they must be set free; if they are found dead or inadvertently killed, they must be buried like a person. Pigs are also considered fady and Tanala people cannot have any contact with them, a taboo most likely originating in Islamic influences.

The mountain of Ambondrombe was also fady for the Tanala and none were allowed to travel there.

=== Funeral rites ===
Among the Tanala it is traditional to keep the body of a deceased individual for a month or more; the dead are then buried in the forest in coffins carved from large logs, with sacrifices to mark the cutting of the log and indications carved into a tree to indicate the location of the burial. In certain Tanala communities, bodies are buried in a tomb, while among others, they are placed inside huts in a designated part of the forest, which is thereafter considered sacred and forbidden to visit.

== Language ==
The Tanala speak a dialect of the Malagasy language, which is a branch of the Malayo-Polynesian language group derived from the Barito languages, spoken in southern Borneo. The Tanala is close to the official dialect, spoken by the Merina of the central highlands, with some minor pronunciation differences.

== Economy ==
The major crops of the Tanala are coffee and rice. They also engage in harvesting wild foods such as honey from the nearby forests but it is taboo for them to consume it themselves because it is often harvested from hives that bees have formed inside Tanala coffins that have been suspended in trees. This product is instead traded or sold to others. The northern Tanala have historically engaged very little in trade owing to the inaccessibility of their communities and difficult terrain.

== Bibliography ==
- Beaujard, Philippe (1983). Princes et paysans - Les Tanala de l'Ikongo: Un espace social du Sud-Est de Madagascar (in French). Paris: Editions L'Harmattan. ISBN 9782296293038.
- Bradt, Hilary; Austin, Daniel (2007). Madagascar (9th ed.). Guilford, CT: The Globe Pequot Press Inc. pp. 113–115. ISBN 978-1-84162-197-5.
- Campbell, Gwyn (2012). David Griffiths and the Missionary "History of Madagascar". Leiden, The Netherlands: Brill. ISBN 9789004209800.
- Condra, Jill (2013). Encyclopedia of National Dress: Traditional Clothing Around the World. Los Angeles: ABC Clio. ISBN 978-0-313-37637-5.
- Diagram Group (2013). Encyclopedia of African Peoples. San Francisco, CA: Routledge. ISBN 9781135963415.
- Gennep, A.V. (1904). Tabou Et Totémisme à Madagascar (in French). Paris: Ernest Leroux. ISBN 978-5-87839-721-6.
- Linton, Ralph (1933). The Tanala: a hill tribe of Madagascar. Marshall Field Expedition to Madagascar, 1926. Chicago: Field Museum of Natural History.
- Ogot, Bethwell A. (1992). Africa from the Sixteenth to the Eighteenth Century. Paris: UNESCO. ISBN 9789231017117.
- Raison-Jourde, Françoise (1983). Les souverains de Madagascar (in French). Paris: Karthala Editions. ISBN 978-2-86537-059-7.
- Thompson, Virginia; Adloff, Richard (1965). The Malagasy Republic: Madagascar Today. San Francisco, CA: Stanford University Press. ISBN 978-0-8047-0279-9.
