= Nicolas Vatomanga =

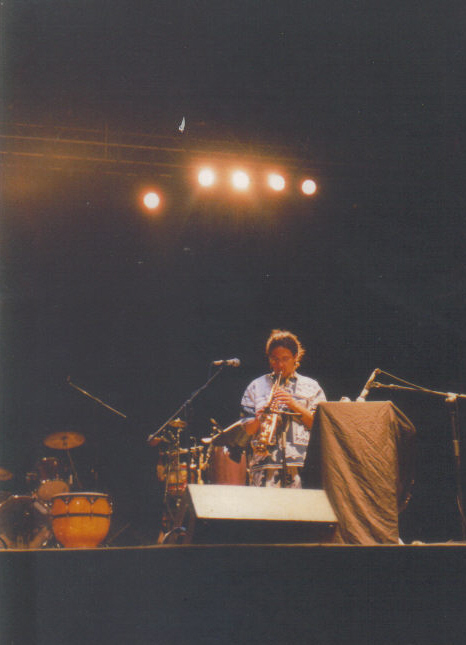
- Nicolas Vatomanga

Background information
- Also known as: Nicolas Vatomanga
- Born: Nicolas Vatomanga Andrianaivo Rakotovao; September 24, 1975 (age 50)
- Genres: Jazz, bebop, jazz fusion, ethno jazz, classical
- Occupations: Musician, composer, bandleader
- Instruments: saxophone, flute, flute sodina, piano
- Years active: 1991–present
- Website: madajazz.com

Nicolas Vatomanga Andrianaivo Rakotovao (born 24 September 1975), known as Nicolas Vatomanga is a Malagasy saxophonist, flutist, bandleader and composer. His music combines elements of jazz, blues and traditional musics of Madagascar, including: the hira gasy of the Centre, the beko from the South and the salegy from the North of the Great Island.

He is also recognized as one of the heirs of the malagsy flute sodina tradition and of its last great master: Rakoto Frah (Philibert Rabezoza Rakoto).

Nicolas Vatomanga has played and/or recorded in Europe, Africa (Senegal and Madagascar), as well as in the United States with: Miriam Makeba, Rakoto Frah, Paco Sery, Eric Le Lann, Regis Gizavo, Solorazaf, Lionel Loueke, Mokhtar Samba, Tony Rabeson, Serge Rahoerson, Linley Marthe, Idrissa Diop, Hanitra Ranaivo, Silo Andrianandraina and Jaojoby Eusèbe. He was invited by Joe Zawinul to play at his concert at the Parc Floral Paris 2002, but he could not honour the invitation.

Since 2004, he has lived and performed in Madagascar, where he created the "Vatomanga Band" which appeared for the first time in quartet form during the Madajazzcar Festival 2005 and gradually enlarged to a septet after 2010. In 2011, the band took the name MadaJazz.

== Biography ==
=== Early life ===
Vatomanga started with classical music at age four at the National Center for Music education (CNEM) in Antananarivo, Madagascar. He was taught by Mrs Alisera and Seta Ramaroson Andrianary (flutist, saxophonist and composer), both renowned teachers there. Choosing the flute as his first instrument, Vatomanga continued training with Seta at the Cercle Germano-Malagasy (CGM) of Antananarivo.

A precocious child, he composed for piano at age eight and played frequently in classical concerts (NCCM, CGM) from age ten. His mother, he claimed, had a great influence on his tastes and his passion for music: classical music, blues, gospel and traditional Malagasy music (such as the hira gasy, the Kalon'ny Fahiny, Ny Antsaly, Rakotozafy and Rakoto Frah in particular); she learned to play valiha (the Malagasy bamboo zither) when he started on flute.

=== Jazz ===
At age fourteen, at Seta's invitation, Vatomanga attended a concert given by American saxophonist and flutist of Caribbean origin, TK Blue (Talib Kibwe). Following the concert, he learned on the flute, from ear and by heart, the theme and the solo of "Pinnacle of Joy" of the album Egyptian Oasis (1987) of the American jazzmen. He, therefore, decided to learn the saxophone and a new form of expression for him: improvised music. Seta, also a jazz saxophonist, taught him jazz basics, especially harmonization of improvisation.

Further encouraged by Silo Andrianandraina (also a young Malagasy jazzman), a friend from second class in high school, Vatomanga listened and explored the world of jazz fundamentals, particularly through the works of Charlie Parker, Miles Davis, George Shearing, Oscar Peterson, Sonny Rollins, Stan Getz, Bill Evans, McCoy Tyner, Herbie Hancock, Wayne Shorter, Joe Zawinul and John Coltrane. "Trane" in particular became a great influence. Attuned to his African roots, he listened to South African jazz, including Makeba, Hugh Masekela and Bheki Mseleku.

At age fifteen, he began learning the saxophone in a band with Solomiral, an Antananarivo jazz fusion band, then informally with Toty Band and a more traditional music group from Southern Madagascar, Tsimihole. In 1992, he participated in his first Madajazzcar Festival, accompanied by an informal group created for the occasion.

Bassist Olver "Toty" Andriamampianina became Vatomanga's second mentor. Seta and Toty provided him constant encouragements to pursue a musical career. Throughout the years of his BSc diploma, he attended the Jazz Club of Mahamasina, founded by pianist and composer Sammy Andriamanoro. Sammy taught him jazz standards for one year.

After earning his BSc in 1993, Vatomanga enrolled in Mathematics at the University of Aix-Marseille III (France) and completed two years of courses, while continuing his music. In 1994 he passed the entrance examination at the Conservatoire d'Aix-en-Provence where he studied jazz for a year, alongside math. During this period, he met Alain "Belain" Rabeson, cousin of drummer Tony Rabeson.

Bassist, drummer and jazz teacher, Belain invited him to play in his Bossa Nova and Samba band. Accompanied on drums by Belain, in 1995 he entered Conservatoire à Rayonnement Régional de Marseille – jazz section - where he studied for one year.

Under Belain's coaching, in 1996 he entered the American School of Modern Music of Paris (affiliate of Berklee College of Music) where he covered the course in three years instead of five. There, he deepened his skills in composition, arrangement and conducting. In the fifth year, he received a scholarship to pursue a final year at Berklee, but declined. At this school he met another American school graduate, Lionel Loueke and a musicologist specializing in Madagascar: Victor Randrianary.

=== Jazz and World Music (1999-2004) ===
Along with his musical studies in Paris, the young saxophonist was invited to play in the trio of drummer Tony Rabeson and trumpeter Eric Le Lann with whom he first played in Duc des Lombards in 1998. These exchanges with Tony Rabeson round off his musical training. During this same period, he played jam sessions with Serge and Nivo Rahoerson in the restaurant's Jazz Club The Arbuci at St. Germain in the Latin Quarter. He also played with bassist Sylvain Marc.

Following his musical studies, over a period of five years from 1999 and 2004, he pursued a career as a sideman. He met guitarist "Solorazaf" Solo Razafindrakoto, then Miriam Makeba's lead guitar. He accompanied the South African singer and attended her 2002 concert in Olympia. He also worked with the Malagasy singer Hanitra and accompanied her at the Jazz à Vannes 2000 Festival. He worked as a sideman for Mossan of Mokhtar Samba, performing at the 2001 Nice Jazz Festival and participated under the name Nicolas Rakoto on his 2005 album Dounia along with Régis Gizavo.

Vatomanga accompanied various international Malagasy and African musical leaders, such as Clement "Kilema" Randrianantoandro-for whom he played on the 1999 album Ka Malisa with Justin Vali, Erick Manana, Regis Gizavo and Rakoto Frah. Along with it, he participated in a series of recordings that led to the albums Chants et Dances en Imerina (2000), and Madagascar: Pays Merina (2001). This work was Rakoto Frah's last album before his death in 2001. Vatomanga played with Senegalese singer Idrissa Diop during a tour in Dakar where he discovered Senegalese music. He also appeared on Germain "Rajery" Randrianarisoa's 2001 album Fanamby. Finally, Vatomanga joined bassist Julio Rakotonanahary (co-founder of the group Wa Zimba) with whom he recorded the 2003 album Mande Wazy.

Open to all forms of artistic expression, he befriended renowned sculptor and composer Jonny "R'afa" Andriamanankoavy, with whom he recorded some of Andriamanankoavy's compositions - the same way he met writer Michèle Rakotoson with whom he also often collaborated.

=== Malagasy roots (2004 –today) ===
In 2004, motivated by the desire to return to Madagascar, Vatomanga moved to Antananarivo. He played in local bands of all genres, but never denying his core: improvisation.

During his inland travels, Vatomanga played and recorded with Silo Andrianandraina (jazz & world jazz), Eusèbe Jaojoby (salegy) whom he had accompanied on the 2001 albumAza Arianao, Ghomy Rahamefy (free jazz), Solo Andrianasolo (jazz & world jazz), Fanja Andriamanantena (jazz & world jazz), Jackie Ralph (world jazz), "Hajazz" Haja Rasolomahatratra (world jazz) Other album work included Melo Gasy with Fanaiky Rasolomahatratra (world jazz) (2008) and Goma (2011), Hazolahy (Music South East), or the Social Fusion Group (world jazz) and Rajery (world).

Vatomanga is featured, along with a dozen Malagasy jazzmen, on the album Malagasy Jazz Social Club: Mada In Blue (2008) initiated by Boussat and Arly Rajaobelina. He performs two of his own compositions.

==== Bandleader ====
In 2005, Vatomanga created the "Vatomanga Band", with whom he appeared regularly in clubs and at the Madajazzcar International Festival. He trained young Malagasy musicians in jazz and other modern music.

The band developed and promoted young talents, including Mahatozo Ravelonjaka, who joined the group after winning the First National Jazz Contest organized by Malagasy Jazz Radio RLI in 2005 at age 23 and Joel “Rabesl” Rabesolo, who joined after winning the same competition in 2006.

In 2011, Vatomanga and his group, in collaboration with the writer Michèle Rakotoson, were actively involved in the creation of the "Slam Jazz Project", a new art form that combines improvised poetry (Slam) with improvised Jazz. The same year, the Vatomanga Septet took the new name of MadaJazz.

=== Band members ===
- 2005 to 2007: "Vatomanga Quartet" : Mahatozo Ravelonjaka (keyboard), Henintsoa Andriamasimanana (bass), Miora Rabarisoa (drums) and Nicolas Vatomanga (soprano, alto and tenor saxophone; sodina flute ).
- 2008 to 2009: "Vatomanga Quintet": Joel “Rabesl” Rabesolo (guitar), Mahatozo Ravelonjaka (keyboard), Miora Rabarisoa (drums), Henintsoa Andriamasimanana (bass) and Nicolas Vatomanga (soprano / alto / tenor sax, flute sodina) .
- 2010: "Vatomanga Septet": Joel "Rabesl" Rabesolo (guitar), Mahatozo Ravelonjaka (keyboard), Miora Rabarisoa (drums), Henintsoa Andriamasimanana (bass), Ludovic (bass), Kim's (keyboard) andriantiana "Nata" Andrianantenaina (trumpet) and Nicolas Vatomanga (soprano / alto / tenor, flute sodina).
- 2011: The Septet became "MadaJazz", with: Joël "Rabesl" Rabesolo (guitar), Miora Rabarisoa (drums), Mika "Kim's" Rajaonarivelo (bass), Ludovic "Dovs" Rakotondraina (keyboard) andriantiana "Nata" Andrianantenaina (trumpet), Laurent Amouric (percussion) and Nicolas Vatomanga (soprano/alto/tenor sax, sodina flute) (featuring : Panayotis Dourantonis, congas, for the Slam Jazz Projekt)

=== Quotes ===
- "Music is a great journey during which you are in a constant discovery." (Interview on Jazz Radio RLI)
- "Jazz music in Madagascar is still perceived both hermetic and elitist: it is a misappropriation of the spirit of jazz itself." (Interview on nocomment)

== Discography ==
=== Jazz ===
Collective album

- 2008: Malagasy Jazz Social Club: In Mada Blue(CD) - Harmonia Mundi
- 2009: SocialFusion - Social Group Production

With Mokhtar Samba

- 2005: Dounia- O + Music

With Julio Rakotonanahary

- 2003: Mande Wazy- Tynda

With Fanaiky Rasolomahatratra

- 2007: MeloGasy - Fan Prod
- 2011: Goma- Fan Prod

With Fanja Andriamanantena

- 2009: No. Isika Miaraka Mo ^ ik Tsotra izao

With Silo Andrianandraina

- 2001: Rimorimo- tysa

Opus unprecedented

- 2000: Redalandy - Opus unprecedented

Public Records

- 2005: Vorompotsy (with Mahatozo Ravelonjaka) - Radio RLI
- 2008: Elatra - Radio RLI
- 2009: Maraindraina- Radio RLI

=== World Music ===
With Rakoto Frah

- 2000: Songs and Dances in Imerina- Arion Music Label
- 2001: MadagascarMerina Country - Ocora Radio France

With Jaojoby Eusèbe

- 2001: Aza Arianao- Blue Label

With Kilema

- 1999: KaMalisa - Iris Music Label

With Rajery

- 2001: Fanamby- Blue Label - Indigo

With Mara Carson

- 2002: Beratro- Autoproduction

== Filmography ==
As a musician and / or interviewed

- 2009: Malagasy Jazz Social Club: In Mada Blue (DVD) - Harmonia Mundi
- 2009: Madagascar: generation jazz (T. Rasoanaivo documentary film)
- 2010: Madajazzcar 2008 - Digital Development Communication
