= Literature of Madagascar =

The literature of Madagascar encompasses the oral and written literary arts of the Malagasy people.

== Oral literary traditions ==
A wide range of oral literary traditions have developed in Madagascar. One of the island's foremost artistic traditions is its oratory, as expressed in the forms of hainteny (poetry), kabary (public discourse) and ohabolana (proverbs). An epic poem exemplifying these traditions, the Ibonia, has been handed down over the centuries in several different forms across the island, and offers insight into the diverse mythologies and beliefs of traditional Malagasy communities. In addition to these artistic traditions, oral histories were passed down across generations. Many stories, poems and histories were retold in musical form. The concept of poetry in traditional Malagasy oral literary traditions is inseparable from song, as demonstrated by the Malagasy words for "poem" - tononkira and tononkalo - which are formed by combining tonony (words) with hira/kalo (song).

== Early written works ==
Arcane knowledge of various kinds, relating to religious rites, herbal medicine and other privileged knowledge, were traditionally recorded by ombiasy (wise men) using the sorabe, an Arabic script adapted to transcribe the Malagasy language. It was introduced by Arab sailors between the 7th and 10th centuries. These earliest written works were only made to be seen by the ombiasy and were not disseminated. Malagasy sovereigns customarily kept ombiasy advisers and were occasionally instructed to read and write in the sorabe script, and may have used it for a wider range of purposes, although few sorabe documents survive to the present.

Elements of oral history and traditional oratory were documented by British and French visitors to the island. The first Malagasy historian was Raombana (1809–1855), one of the first pupils of the London Missionary Society school at the Rova of Antananarivo, who documented early 19th century Merina history in English and Malagasy. The Tantara ny Andriana eto Madagasikara, a compilation of the oral history of the Merina sovereigns, forms another major source of knowledge about traditional highland society and was collected and published in the late 19th century by a Catholic priest residing in the highlands.

== Malagasy literature ==
Written, western-inspired literary arts developed in Madagascar shortly after colonization, with its initial emergence in the 1906-1938 period, which can be divided into four phases. The first phase is known as miana-mamindra (learning to walk) in Malagasy and extended from 1906-1914. During this time, a first wave of artists began writing poetry, novels and journals in the European style. In line with the French separation of church and state, these artists self-identified as mpino (believers) who were inspired by religious themes, and the tsy mpino (non-believers) who were more deeply inspired by their imagination. Many of these artists were members of Vy Vato Sakelika, a cultural organization with secret nationalist objectives. The French administration's discovery of the group's intent and consequent exile of many of its members created a veritable gap in the development of literature on the island from 1915 to 1922. The second phase, from 1922 to 1929, saw artists explore the Malagasy themes of embona sy hanina (nostalgia). This was followed by a third phase focused on ny lasa (a return to origins). The fourth phase, mitady ny very (the search for what's been lost) began in 1932. These themes illustrate the larger theme of lost identity, alienation and nostalgia for the past that emerged from the experience of colonization. These were followed in 1934-1938 by the theme of hita ny very (the lost is found).

The artists writing throughout the 1906-1938 period are known in Madagascar by two terms: the mpanoratra zokiny (elders), principally born under the former Merina monarchy, and the mpanoratra zandriny (juniors) who were born under the French administration and were typically driven to recapture and celebrate the past before colonization.

The first modern African poet, a Merina named Jean-Joseph Rabearivelo (1901 or 1903–1937), gained celebrity for blending surrealist, romantic and modernist poetic forms with elements of traditional Malagasy oratory, as well as his suicide by cyanide in 1937. Rabearivelo was also among the first to publish historical novels and wrote Madagascar's only Western-style opera. This blending of Western and traditional influence in the literary arts was carried on by such artists as Elie Rajaonarison, an exemplar of the new wave of Malagasy poetry. Other notable poets include Jacques Rabemananjara, Pierre Randrianarisoa, Georges Andriamanantena (Rado), Jean Verdi Salomon Razakandraina (Dox) and others. Leading authors include Jean-Luc Raharimanana, Michèle Rakotoson, Clarisse Ratsifandrihamanana, David Jaomanoro, Solofo Randrianja, Emilson Daniel Andriamalala and Celestin Andriamanantena. A number of comic books have also been created by Malagasy authors such as Anselme Razafindrainibe (1956–2011).

Many Malagasy literary artists have placed great emphasis on promoting and celebrating both the beauty and versatility of the Malagasy language and the richness of Malagasy oral traditions.

== Malagasy literary artists ==
- Elie-Charles Abraham (1919– ), poet.
- Georges Andriamanantena (Rado), poet.
- David Jaomanoro (1953–2014), poet, short story writer and playwright.
- Esther Nirina (1932–2004), poet.
- Hajasoa Vololona Picard-Ravololonirina (1956– ), academic, politician and poet.
- Jean-Joseph Rabearivelo (1903–1937), poet and novelist.
- Jacques Rabemanajara (1913– ), poet, playwright and politician.
- Raymond William Rabemananjara (1913– ), historian and writer.
- Charlotte Arisoa Rafenomanjato (1938–2008), writer and translator.
- Jean-Luc Raharimanana (1967– ), French-language writer.
- Elie Rajaonarison (1951–2010), poet, playwright, translator and photographer.
- Regis Rajemisa-Raolison (1913– ), poet and educator.
- Michele Rakotoson (1948– ), novelist, short story writer and playwright.
- Ny Avana Ramanantoanina, (1891-1940) poet.
- Flavien Ranaivo (1914–1999), poet and writer.
- Pierre Randrianarisoa, poet.
- Jean Verdi Salomon Razakandraina (Dox) (1913-1978), poet, novelist, playwright, translator and musician.

== See also ==
- King Ravohimena and the Magic Grains

== Bibliography ==
- Auzias, Dominique; Labourdette, Jean-Paul (2007). Petit Futé: Madagascar 2008 (in French). Paris: Petit Futé. ISBN 978-2-7469-1982-2.
- Fox, Leonard (1990). Hainteny: the traditional poetry of Madagascar. Lewisburg, PA: Bucknell University Press. ISBN 978-0-8387-5175-6.
- Killam, Douglas; Rowe, Ruth (2000). The Companion to African Literatures. Bloomington, IN: Indiana University Press. ISBN 0-253-33633-3.
- Schirmer, Robert; Gikandi, Simon (2013). Encyclopedia of African Literature. London: Routledge. ISBN 9781134582235.
- Rabearivelo, Jean-Joseph (2007) [1936 (translation by Robert Ziller)]. Translated from the Night. Pittsburgh, PA: Lascaux Editions. ISBN 978-1-60461-552-4.
