= Feo-Gasy =

- Origin: Madagascar
- Genre: Ba-gasy
- Years active: 1995-present
- Members: Erick Manana (acoustic guitar and vocals); Jean-Colbert Ranaivoarison (acoustic guitar and vocals); Famantanantsoa Rajaonarison (vocals); François-Daniel Rabeanirainy (vocals)
- Past members: Rakoto Frah (sodina and vocals); Bariliva Rasoavatsara (valiha and vocals)

Feo-Gasy is a band from Madagascar that perform a traditional ba-gasy music of the Merina people of the rural central highlands around the capital city of Antananarivo. The band was founded in 1995 by superstar guitarist Erick Manana and featured until his 2001 death the iconic sodina player Rakoto Frah, the only Malagasy musician ever to be featured on the local currency.

The group was originally composed of the acoustic guitarist and singer Erick Manana, the sodina player and singer Rakoto Frah, singer and guitarist Jean-Colbert Ranaivoarison ("Kolibera"), vocalists Famantanantsoa Rajaonarison ("Fafah") and François-Daniel Rabeanirainy ("Benny"), and valiha player Bariliva Rasoavatsara, who died in December 2012.

Feo Gasy "Rakoto Frah" (1996)
Sodina performance by Rakoto Frah in a song dedicated to him by group Feo Gasy

== Discography ==
Title	Released	Label	Tracks (Length)
Ramano	2000	Daqui	12 (43'55")
Tsofy Rano	1996	Mélodie	12 (43'55")

== See also ==
- Music of Madagascar
