= Lee Haring =

American folklorist

- Born: 1930 (age 95–96)
- Awards: Guggenheim Fellowship (1998); AFS Lifetime Scholarly Achievement Award (2013)

Academic background
- Education: Haverford College (AB); Columbia University (AM, PhD)

Academic work
- Discipline: Folklore; literary studies
- Sub-discipline: Malagasy verbal arts; Indian Ocean folklore; creolization
- Institutions: Brooklyn College (CUNY)
- Notable works: Malagasy Tale Index (1982); Verbal Arts in Madagascar (1992); Ibonia: Epic of Madagascar (1994); Stars and Keys (2007); How to Read a Folktale (2013); Folktales of Mayotte (2023)

Lee Haring (born 1930) is an American folklorist and literary scholar known for his research, translations, and theorization of the oral literatures of Madagascar and the islands of the southwest Indian Ocean. He is professor emeritus of English at Brooklyn College of the City University of New York.

Haring's major publications include the comprehensive Malagasy Tale Index (1982), the monograph Verbal Arts in Madagascar: Performance in Historical Perspective (1992), an English translation of the epic Ibonia (1994), the collection-and-study Stars and Keys: Folktales and Creolization in the Indian Ocean (2007), and two open-access volumes with Open Book Publishers: How to Read a Folktale (2013) and Folktales of Mayotte, an African Island (2023).

He received a Guggenheim Fellowship in Folklore & Popular Culture in 1998 and the American Folklore Society’s Lifetime Scholarly Achievement Award in 2013.

== Early life and education ==
Haring earned the A.B. at Haverford College and the A.M. and Ph.D. at Columbia University.

== Academic career ==
Haring taught at Guilford College (1953–1956) and then at Brooklyn College from 1957 until his retirement in 1999 (lecturer to full professor; emeritus thereafter). He also taught in graduate folklore programs at the University of California, Berkeley, the University of Pennsylvania, and the University of Connecticut.

As a founding faculty member of Friends World College (a global study program), Haring resided in Kenya, where he began work on East African traditions.

== Fieldwork and research areas ==
Haring’s fieldwork centers on the Indian Ocean islands and East Africa, notably Madagascar (as Fulbright Senior Lecturer), Mauritius (as Fulbright researcher), and Kenya. In 1975-1976 he served as a Fulbright Senior Lecturer at the University of Madagascar (now the University of Antananarivo).

== Research themes and contributions ==
Haring’s research foregrounds performance, translation, and the historical circulation of genres across the southwest Indian Ocean. His Malagasy Tale Index provides a comprehensive analytic catalogue for Madagascar’s folktales and is cited for its theoretical and methodological implications of tale-type indexing.

In Verbal Arts in Madagascar (1992) he analyzes four genres (riddles, proverbs, hainteny, and oratory) within colonial and postcolonial histories and provides English translations of many texts.

Haring’s long-term work on creolization establishes that narrative techniques such as genre-mixing, framing, and quotation emerge in multiethnic island societies and shape both tale forms and performance contexts. Key essays include “Techniques of Creolization” (Journal of American Folklore, 2003) and “African Folktales and Creolization in the Indian Ocean Islands” (Research in African Literatures, 2002). The book Stars and Keys (2007) extends this analysis through translations and commentary on a hundred folktales originating from Madagascar, Mauritius, Seychelles, Réunion, and the Comoros.

Haring has also written on classification and comparative method in Malagasy narrative studies, including “The Classification of Malagasy Narrative” (1980).

== Major publications ==
- Malagasy Tale Index. Helsinki: Academia Scientiarum Fennica, Folklore Fellows’ Communications 231, 1982. 505 pp.
- Verbal Arts in Madagascar: Performance in Historical Perspective. Philadelphia: University of Pennsylvania Press, 1992; Anniversary Collection reprint, 2017.
- Ibonia: Epic of Madagascar (translation and introduction). Lewisburg: Bucknell University Press, 1994.
- Stars and Keys: Folktales and Creolization in the Indian Ocean. Bloomington: Indiana University Press, 2007.
- How to Read a Folktale: The “Ibonia” Epic from Madagascar. Cambridge: Open Book Publishers, 2013 (open access).
- Folktales of Mayotte, an African Island. Cambridge: Open Book Publishers, 2023 (World Oral Literature Series, vol. 10; open access).

=== Selected edited/related collections ===
- (ed., with Dawood Auleear) Indian Folktales from Mauritius. Chennai: National Folklore Support Centre, 2006.
- Anu koleksyonn folklor Moris = Collecting Folklore in Mauritius (bilingual field manual). Port Louis: Ledikasyon pu Travayer, 2001.
- Earlier manual: Collecting Folklore in Mauritius. Moka: Mahatma Gandhi Institute, 1992.

=== Selected articles ===
- “The Classification of Malagasy Narrative.” Research in African Literatures 11(3): 342–355 (1980).
- “Techniques of Creolization.” Journal of American Folklore 116(459): 19–35 (2003).
- “Framing in Oral Narrative.” Journal of Folklore Research 41(2/3): 125–155 (2004).
- “African Folktales and Creolization in the Indian Ocean Islands.” Research in African Literatures 33(3): 182–199 (2002).

== Honors and recognition ==
- Guggenheim Fellowship in Folklore & Popular Culture (1998).
- American Folklore Society Lifetime Scholarly Achievement Award (2013).

== See also ==
- Ibonia
- Malagasy literature
- Creolization
