= King Ravohimena and the Magic Grains =

Malagasy folktale

King Ravohimena and the Magic Grains (French: Le Roi Ravohimena ou les graines magiques) is a Malagasy folktale, first published by ethnologist Jeanne de Longchamps in 1955. It is related to the theme of the calumniated wife and is classified in the international Aarne-Thompson-Uther Index as ATU 707, "The Three Golden Children".

These tales refer to stories where a girl promises a king she will bear a child or children with wonderful attributes, but her jealous relatives or her husband's other wives plot against the babies and their mother. Variants of the tale type were collected in Madagascar.

== Sources ==
The tale was collected in Belu, near Tsiribihina River (West Coast of Madagascar), and published by Jeanne de Longchamps.

== Translations ==
The tale was translated into Russian as "Андриамбахуака Равухимена и волшебные зерна" ("Andrianbahuaca Ravuhimena and the Magic Grains"), and to German as König Ravohimena oder die Zauberkörner.

== Summary ==
Local nobleman Ravuhimena walks about in his properties and listens to the conversations between three sisters: the eldest promises to weave a hundred braids with a single thread; the middle one that she will weave a thousand with a single thread; and the youngest promises to give birth to five sons by him after she eats five grains. Ravuhimena approaches the three girls and admires the beauty of the youngest. He then decides to marry all three sisters.

He takes them to his palace and gives the eldest and the middle sister a thread and they fail in weaving. The youngest, Refarane, is given five grains and becomes pregnant. While Ravohimena goes to war, Refarana gives birth to five children, but her sisters replace the children for oxen jowl and rags. Her sisters summon a witch and turns Refarane into an animal, and she escapes to the forest.

The children are cast in the river, but they are saved by "The Man of the Forest". Meanwhile, one of Ravohimena's slaves goes to the forest to chop firewood, when a ghostly voice stops him by saying that the slave in Ravohimena's forest. The slave tells the man of the forest about it and they go to the location of the voice. The man in the forest sees a little lemur and asks it its name. The lemur says she is Refarane.

Ravohimena comes back from war and asks his two co-wives about Refarane's whereabouts. The sisters lie that she gave birth to abominations and fled into the forest. One day, on a hunt, Ravohimena finds the five children playing in the woods in front of the Man of the Forest's hut. The king enters the hut and asks him about the children, and suspicions begin to form in his mind that they are his children.

Ravohimena visits a Mpsikidi, who confirms the story of the Man in the Forest. Ravohimena asks what he can do to save Refarane. The Mpsikidi advises him to seek a little man with long hair. The king goes to the little man with long hair, who asks him to get him first honey from red bees in a fresh plantain leaf, then to kill a white boar in the woods. Ravohimena takes on his quests, gets the honey and kills the white boar, then brings it. The little man then asks to be deloused. Ravohimena delouses him, but only finds rice grains. He fills a basket with them and the little man advises him to take the basket to the child of Ampelamananohi.

Ravohimena takes the basket to Ampelamananohi's house and places it outside to lure the creature. Ampelamananohi arrives with his son and smells the rice basket. He gets close to eat it, when Ravohimena and his men kill the father with spears and take the son with them.

Ravohimena goes to the man in the forest's hut and takes his children with them to a grand feast in their homage. During the feast, Ampelamananohi's son begins to sing a song about how three sisters promised to marry Ravohimena, each promising an extraordinary feat. Ampelamananohi's son continues to sing it, and Ravohimena asks him about Refarane. Ampelamananohi's son walks to the forest and the crows follows him. The creature stops by a tree with a little lemur on it. Ravohimena asks if the lemur is his wife Refarane. The lemur commands the tree to bend if she is indeed Refarane. The tree bends, the little lemur climbs down and turns into Refarane. Her sisters hang down their heads in shame, one of them becoming a lemur and the other a cricket.

== Analysis ==
=== Tale type ===
The tale is classified in the international Aarne-Thompson-Uther Index as tale type ATU 707, "The Three Golden Children". Czech scholar Karel Horálek also recognized the tale as another variant of type ATU 707.

According to Lee Haring's Malagasy Tale Index, the tale type is one of 78 international types found in both Madagascar and elsewhere. Similarly, in an article in Enzyklopädie des Märchens, folklorist Lee Haring noted that type 707, "The Three Golden Children", was also "known" in Madagascar. The collectors noted that the tale type adapted and integrated into traditions of the country, becoming "a clan legend, an explanation for uxorilocal marriage, and a cautionary tale against polygamy".

== Variants ==
According to Lee Haring, eight variants of tale type 707 have been collected in Madagascar: two tales from the Merina, a clan tale and a tale titled Haitraitra an'olombelona, zaka an'nanahary (or Andriambahoaka sy ny zanany); two tales from the Betsileo, one titled Le mari et ses trois femmes and the other "Andriabohoemanana and the unfortunate Rafaravavy"; two tales from the Sakalava, titled "Ramikiloke" and "The speaking bird".

=== History of the Nobles of Madagascar ===
In a Merina tale described in the book Tantara ny Andriana eto Madagasikara ("History of the Nobles in Madagascar"), Andriambavirano came down from heaven, goddess Andriambavirano ("Princess of the Water") descends to earth in leaf form near a lake in the Angavo mountain. Andriamanjavona, "royal prince of double affiliation" and son of sovereign Andriandravindravina, is destined to take it, which he does by singing a magical charm. He captures the leaf and takes it home. The leaf becomes a woman named Andriambavirano and they marry. The "vadibe", the first wife, casts away Andriambavirano's three children (two boys and a girl), but they are saved by a foster father. Further sources state the three children (the elder boy named Rabingoanony, the younger boy Andrianjatovorovola and the girl Ratandratandravola) are saved by a creature called Konantitra and later become heroes and heroines. Professor Lee Haring noted the connection to the international tale type ATU 707, "The Three Golden Children".

=== The man and his three wives ===
French orientalist Gabriel Ferrand collected a tale in Fianarantsoa, from the Betsileo with the title Le mari et ses trois femmes ("The man and his three wives"). In this tale, a man takes three wives so he could sire children. His third wife becomes pregnant, to his delight and to the jealousy of the other co-wives, who distract him by saying they wish to eat some lamb meat. The man leaves on a hunt with servants, leaving the third wive unprotected at the mercy of the co-wives. She gives birth to a boy named Razafinjato and a girl called Ramitriavola, but the other co-wives replace them for objects and cast them in the sea in a box. An old woman who lived in a garden saves the box and raises the twins. Years later, she directs both of them to their father. When the co-wives meet the twins, they set the boy and the girl on a quest for some jewels by the margin of the river where alligators roamed, and later to cut the tail of a dangerous bull. The brother performs these tasks, despite the danger, and leaves unscathed. The tale was noted to have "the same narrative" as "Ravohimena and the Magic Grains", but framed within a more realistic lens.

=== The Speaking Bird ===
In a variant from the Sakalava, collected by Norwegian missionary Émile Birkeli in Morondava with the title Voromivola or L'oiseau parler ("The Speaking Bird"), two sisters, Talanôlo and Reivone go to a local celebration, leaving behind their youngest sister, Refarane. However, Refarane appears at the event on a horse. The king sees her and is smitten, wanting to marry her. Refarane gives birth to two children (the older a boy) who are replaced for a cat and a little mouse, and thrown in the water. They are saved by an old woman and find a talking bird (Voromivola), who tells them the truth and helps them reconcile their family.

=== Fara and Her Children ===
In a Malagasy tale translated to Russian with the title "Фара и её дети" ("Fara and her children"), first published in 1962, Andriambahuaca has no wife, and three sisters make grand boasts to impress him: the first two that they can weave a hundred salaq of silk, while the third, named Fara, promises to bear him triplets. Andriambahuaca dotes on Fara, and even leaves to buy her eight herds of oxen. While he is away, Fara gives birth to her triplets. She sends her maidservant to fetch fire from her sisters, but with explicit orders not to reveal she gave birth. The maidservant spins a story Fara beat her and asks for fire, but the sisters hear the babies crying and discover their nephews. Distraught, they replace the children for an ox's mandible, a hammer and a broom, and cast them in the water in a box. When Andriambahuaca returns, the sisters trick the village that their cadette gave birth to abominations and lock her in a distant hut. As for the children, sorcerer Ranakumbe sights the box floating in water and summons it towards him. He rescues the children and named them Andriantsimatinasaikya (the elder male triplet), Andriamandiadiavulya (the younger male triplet) and Ingyalingalivula (the girl). The triplets grow up, and go near Andriambahuaca's village to play and sing about being Fara's children and about their aunts' punishment. Andriambahuaca returns from his long journey and finds Fara in a sorry state, then learns of the deceit played by her sisters. Sorcerer Ranakumbe and his wife, witnesses to the deception, testify in Fara's favour and acquit her. Andriambahuaca punishes his co-wives and reunites with his wife and children. In the second part of the tale, after the children are now older, a half-woman named Ikyalamiisimba, for she has one leg, one foot, one arm, lives in a cave, but leaves to visit Ingyalingalivula. The half-woman compliments the girl's beauty, but says she is lacking a necklace made of crocodile teeth to be even more beautiful. Andriambahuaca scolds his daughter for such a dangerous request, but her elder triplets decide to fulfill her request. Next, Ikyalamiisimba tells the girl to seek jewels made of hippopotamus tusks; thirdly, to have the Mamukurov family as her servants (the elder brothers kidnap some of the Mamukurov children and chop their tails); fourthly, to fetch the Imasuampatan drum ("Imasuampatan" meaning 'people that live in the south and watch the fire when they go to sleep'); and lastly about fetching the son of God as their sister's bridegroom. For the last quest, the brothers go to a place where Andriamanitra's servants are drawing water and are seen. The servant alert their deity of the strangers' presence, and Andriamanitra asks if they are men or women. The duo answers they are men, and die for their reply. Back to Ingyalingalivula, she notices her triplets' delay and goes to search for them. She reaches the same well and Andriamanitra's servants inform the deity of the beautiful stranger's presence. Andriamanitra asks if she is a woman (who is to be sent to him) or man (for he will kill them). Ingyalingalivula answers she is a woman, but demands her brothers be restored to life. Andriamanitra does as requested, elevates the triplets to the skies and marries Ingyalingalivula to his son.

=== Ingalingalivola ===
In a Malagasy tale titled Ingalingalivola, king Andriambahoaka rules his kingdom in peace and prosperity. One day, three sisters, the most beautiful of the region, but the cadette, Fara, being the most beautiful of the three, pass by the area where the king's sheep graze, and talk to one another about their marriage wishes: the elder boasts she could use a single grain of rice to feed a hundred of the king's servants, the middle one that she could sew a whole "pagne" with a single fiber of hemp, and the Fara promises to bear him triplets after eating three kidneys. The king's shepherds overhear the sisters' conversation and informs the king, who marries all three. The elder is given a grain of rice, but cannot prepare any meal; the middle one, Raivo, does not what to do with the only fiber she is given, and Fara is given the kidneys and becomes pregnant. One day, Andriambahoaka departs on a journey, and the elder sisters soon strike against their cadette: she gives birth to triplets, two boys and a girl, who are cast in water and replaced by a comb, a broom and a pebble. The co-wives blame Fara for being a sorceress, and the king locks her up. Years later, the king walks by the river, when he spots three children playing, a girl and two boys, overlooked by an old couple. Amdrianbahoaka thinks the children have royal countenance and ask the old couple about them: they are indeed his children. Andriambahoaka rewards the old couple and takes his children back, then restore his wife Fara from prison, then punishes his other co-wives Ramatoa and Raivo by shaving their hair and forcing them to be servants to their cadette.

Time passes, and the triplets grow up. In time, the princess, Ngalingalivola, becomes capricious. One day, she leaves the mansion and goes to a cave, where she meets a young woman named Impisimba, who nurtures jealousy towards the girl. Impisimba tells the princess she is beautiful, but will be even more if she wears a rhinoceros horn. Princess Ngalingalivola tells her brothers she wants one, and her brothers kill a rhinoceros to pluck its horn. Next, Impisimba tells Ngalingalivola she would want the great box of the Imasoampatana (translated as 'the ones whose eyes are turned to the fire'), which is a drum with magic powers. The elder princes go to befriend the Imasoampatana, a band of brothers, and steal the drum. Lastly, Impisimba tells Ngalingalivola she is so beautiful she deserves to marry the son of the Sky king. Ngalingalivola then sends her brothers to bring him. The brothers depart and approach a spring where the subjects of the Sky king convene to draw water. A servant of the Sky king tells the monarch there are strangers at the spring, and the Sky king says they should be brought in if they are female, and killed if male. It happens thus, and the princes are killed. Ngalingalivola fears for her brothers, and departs after them. She finds their corpses and mourns over them for days. The Sky king's servants who come to draw water find her crying and try to bring her to Sky king, but she refuses to abandon her brothers. The Sky king orders her servants to revive the princes, and the triplets reunite. The Sky king welcomes them and they live in eternal happiness with want of nothing.

=== Other tales ===
French ethnologue Paul Ottino also analysed two similar Malagasy variants with the substitution of the children for objects and the jealous queens casting the children in the water, one of them titled Ifaranomby, published in 1955 by researcher Jeanne de Longchamps.

== See also ==
- The Child with a Moon on his Chest (Sotho)
