= Rakoto Frah =

Flautist and composer from Madagascar (1923–2001)

- Rakoto before 1988

Background information
- Birth name: Philibert Rabezoza
- Born: 1923; Ankadinandriana, Madagascar
- Died: 29 September 2001 (aged 77–78); Antananarivo, Madagascar
- Genres: Vakindrazana, hira gasy, vazikoava
- Instrument(s): Sodina, voice

Philibert Rabezoza (1923 – 29 September 2001), better known by the name Rakoto Frah, was a flautist and composer of traditional music of the central highlands of Madagascar. Born in 1923 near the capital city of Antananarivo to a poor rural family, Rakoto Frah surmounted the challenges posed by his underprivileged origins to become the most acclaimed 20th century performer of the sodina flute, one of the oldest traditional instruments on the island. Through frequent international concerts and music festival performances, he promoted the music of the highlands of Madagascar and became one of the most famous Malagasy artists, both within Madagascar and on the world music scene.

After gaining regional recognition for his sodina skills as a youth, Rakoto Frah rose to national fame in 1958 when he was selected by Malagasy President Philibert Tsiranana to perform on the sodina for the visiting French president Charles de Gaulle. This event launched his career as a professional musician. He first played at traditional ceremonies around the country, then expanded his performances from 1967 to include participation in international music competitions and festivals. His popularity declined in the 1970s but underwent a revival that began in the mid-1980s and continued until his death in 2001. During this period Rakoto Frah recorded ten albums, toured extensively in Madagascar and overseas, was featured in two French documentaries, and collaborated with a variety of international and Malagasy artists. Over the course of his career he recorded over 800 original compositions. Rakoto Frah and his sodina were depicted on the 200 ariary Malagasy banknote in honor of his key role in revitalizing and internationally popularizing the sodina. Despite the artist's worldwide acclaim, he lived simply and died having earned little from his lifetime of musicianship. His death was widely mourned and marked by a state funeral, and in 2011 a famadihana (the Malagasy highland "turning of the bones" funerary tradition) was organized to celebrate the artist's life.

== Biography ==
=== Early years ===
Philibert Rabezoza was born in 1923 in Ankadinandriana, a suburb of Antananarivo. His mother was born in Antananarivo and his father, a herdsman and farmer from Fianarantsoa, had previously been a singer at the Merina royal court before the colonization of Madagascar in 1897. Both of Philibert's parents were already aged at the time of his birth and they struggled to care for their new son alongside his six brothers and four sisters. As a child, Philibert assisted his family with looking after the livestock and farming their plot of land. In his early years he was given the nickname Rakoto by an older brother of the same name.

Like many residents of the rural areas in central Madagascar at that time, Rakoto's brothers played the sodina, an end-blown tube traditionally made of bamboo or reed with three or six finger holes and a thumb hole down its length. One of the oldest and most iconic musical instruments in Madagascar, it is believed to have arrived on the island with the earliest settlers from Borneo around 2,000 years ago and remains widespread throughout the central highlands. Young Rakoto began playing the sodina when he was seven years old. He honed his skills by listening to village elders' sodina performances, and three years later the boy formed a small musical group called Ambohijatobe that performed locally at traditional festivities. During this period Rakoto had the opportunity to participate in a community musical competition. His competitors, who performed on accordions and guitars, threw stones at Rakoto when he stepped forward to perform on the sodina. Despite being struck in the face he completed his performance and was awarded first prize. In 1935 he was nominated by the local governor to represent his district in a national musical competition organized by the French colonial authority at Mahamasina stadium in Antananarivo. That same year Rakoto was orphaned at the age of 12, preventing him from further pursuing an education in the interest of earning a livelihood. A Frenchman hired the boy to work as an assistant baker until he came of age. Upon reaching adulthood, Rakoto left the bakery to become a metalworker while continuing to perform on the sodina in musical ensembles.

=== Rise to prominence ===
Rakoto's opportunity for national fame arrived with the 1958 visit of French President Charles de Gaulle to Madagascar. The visit was in conjunction with the dissolution of colonial status and naming of Philibert Tsiranana as Prime Minister, part of the island's transition to full independence in 1960. Tsiranana had previously seen the flutist perform and invited Rakoto and his group of 18 musicians to accompany de Gaulle and perform traditional pieces during a portion of the French statesman's walking tour through the capital city of Antananarivo. Following this performance, Rakoto dedicated himself full-time to a career in music, performing regularly at traditional celebrations on the island. Tsiranana, who became president of Madagascar two years later, was the first to refer to the artist as Rakoto Frah, the name that the musician would use for the rest of his career.

International recognition of Rakoto Frah and his performance of traditional sodina music began with his first overseas voyage to Algeria in 1967. The artist led a troupe of 18 Malagasy musicians selected to represent the island's various ethnic groups at the International Festival of Algiers. Among the 80 competitors hailing from a variety of countries, Rakoto Frah's troupe won the gold medal. This success was followed by performances in Japan, England, the United States, India, Germany, China, Norway, Finland, Australia and France, making him one of the first musicians to perform traditional Malagasy music at music festivals and concerts outside of Madagascar. At these performances, he was often accompanied by supporting musicians under the group name Orchestre Nationale. By exposing international audiences to sodina performances, Rakoto Frah promoted the instrument and the traditional musical heritage of Madagascar across the globe. The government of President Tsirananana fell into disfavor and was overturned in 1972, and Rakoto Frah's close association with the unpopular former head of state led the artist to be marginalized for the first half of the administration of his successor, Didier Ratsiraka (1975–1993).

=== Renewed popularity ===
In 1985, producers Ben Mandelson and Roger Armstrong visited Madagascar in search of artists to record for a planned album of Malagasy music. Rakoto Frah soon came to their attention, and they offered him a full-length album of his own. Two of Rakoto Frah's granddaughters provided vocals for this album, which was entitled Rakoto Frah: Flute Master of Madagascar. From the mid-1980s onward, Rakoto Frah enjoyed a revival in popularity, particularly among the youth, many of whom were seeking to reconnect with the traditions of their elders. In addition to recording numerous tracks and albums of his own, the flutist often appeared as a guest artist on the albums of others. Rakoto Frah again became one of the most famous and respected musicians within Madagascar and among the most recognized Malagasy performers in the world music circuit.

Feo Gasy "Rakoto Frah" (1996)
Sodina performance by Rakoto Frah in a song dedicated to him by group Feo Gasy

Rakoto Frah released a series of albums and performed internationally throughout the 1990s. The World Out of Time compilation, recorded and produced by David Lindley and Henry Kaiser in 1991, featured him alongside a variety of other performers of the island's diverse musical genres and instruments; two further compilations with Lindley and Kaiser followed in 1993 and 1994. In 1994 Rakoto Frah performed with the Malagasy All Stars on their tour of Germany. The following year he experienced a further increase in national and international prominence as a founding member of the group Feo Gasy, which also featured the internationally acclaimed Malagasy guitarist and singer-songwriter Erick Manana. Together the band recorded two albums: Ramano in 1996 and Tsofy Rano in 1999. Malagasy guitarist Solo Razafindrakoto produced Rakoto Frah's Souffles de Vie in 1998, and Rakoto Frah's final album, Chants et danses en Imerina, was released in October 2000.

Despite his popularity, the artist earned very little from his musical career. This was in part due to weak enforcement of copyright laws in Madagascar, which enabled the profits from illegally copied albums to go directly to pirates. Throughout his career as a professional musician he lived in the poor neighborhood of Anatihazo-Isotry in Antananarivo with 30 members of his family. There he produced instruments and provided lessons in sodina performance. In the later years of his life, Rakoto Frah had over 80 students at any given time. He was also a respected source of counsel in the neighborhood and was frequently visited by community members seeking his wisdom and advice. When based in Madagascar, the artist regularly accepted paid offers to perform on the sodina at traditional events such as famadihana (the Malagasy highland "turning of the bones" funerary tradition), circumcision ceremonies, weddings, engagement ceremonies, and traditional festivals held to celebrate the first rice harvest of the year. These events could last up to seven days, including performances throughout the night, and often required several days of travel to arrive at the site. Rakoto Frah was an avid fan of rugby, and he and his ensemble would regularly perform flute and drum music at national team matches. His final international festival performance was the Festival de Langon held in France in August 2001.

Rakoto Frah died on 29 September 2001 in the Ravoahangy Andrianavalona hospital of Antananarivo following heart problems and a lung infection. In the days following his death, the Malagasy government organized a public celebration in his honor at Mahamasina stadium. His body was laid in the family tomb in his home village of Ankadinandriana on 3 October.

== Style ==
Rakoto Frah's improvisational talent, his ability to adapt to each family's tradition, and his mastery of the flute made him one of the most sought-after musicians for [traditional] ceremonies ... He is the Malagasy culture's tie between modernity and tradition.

— Frank Tenaille, Music is the Weapon of the Future (2002)

Rakoto Frah performed traditional vakindrazana and vazikoava pieces for sodina, commonly heard at a variety of holidays and rites observed in the central highlands of Madagascar. The music accompanying the famadihana reburial ceremonies of the central highlands, for instance, is typically performed by an ensemble of sodina players accompanied by the amponga drum. These sodina performances, which express the joy of reuniting with the ancestors, are often competitive. More than one troupe may be present at the famadihana and will take turns showing off their musical skills, with the rapid flight of notes intended to inspire dancing over the course of the entire day or week of the celebration. The rural artistic tradition of the hira gasy is equally joyful but more elaborate, showcasing the music, dance and oratory skills of a large troupe that includes male and female vocalists, drums, sodina, and a variety of orchestral instruments such as clarinets, trumpets and violins.

Although he learned his repertoire by listening to elders perform traditional pieces, Rakoto Frah often performed personalized variations and interpreted the traditional airs in original ways. The themes addressed in his songs ranged from serious to light-hearted and could touch on social concerns, behavior and the description of places. Rakoto Frah used both traditional flutes and those he crafted himself using diverse locally available materials. These included flutes crafted from sections of metal ski poles, PVC pipes and plastic curtain rods. He was never known to be without a flute and was widely respected for his musical virtuosity and his kindness alike. Rakoto Frah described music the most important element of life, even more important to him than his own family. Over the course of his career, the artist produced more than 800 pieces of instrumental and vocal music.

Several collaborations between Rakoto Frah and other international artists have been recorded. Rakoto Frah is featured on tracks recorded with Manu Dibango, jazz artists David Lindley and Henry Keiser, Kassav', and Ladysmith Black Mambazo, whom he met while performing in India. As a musician who played by ear, he would join an ongoing performance by listening carefully to determine the key of the song. The American composer and jazz saxophonist Ornette Coleman described Rakoto Frah as having "some of the best phrasing of any musician in the world". He was also cited as a key influence by Ian Anderson, the flutist and leader of 1970s British rock group Jethro Tull. In the liner notes for the 1991 compilation A World Out of Time, producers David Lindley and Henry Kaiser expressed their admiration for the artist, stating: "He is one of the most amazing master musicians and individuals that we have ever met. His mastery of the sodina is on a level that you could only compare to great, western instrumental masters like John Coltrane, Ornette Coleman, Billy Pigg or Miles Davis. Rakoto Frah certainly seems to know mysterious things about the phrasing of melodies that nobody else knows." Contemporary Malagasy artists performing in diverse genres ranging from heavy metal and hip hop to jazz and the traditional mangaliba have cited the sodina master as an inspiration and legend in the pantheon of Malagasy cultural figures.

== Legacy ==
His greatest achievement was without a doubt keeping alive the tradition of this iconic instrument of the Red Island during the colonial period and then revitalizing it after independence. His airy, elegant, spare and extremely pure phrasing made its mark on all the musical styles of the island ...

— "Rakoto Frah", Afrisson (7 May 2007)

Over the course of his life, Rakoto Frah was commemorated by fellow artists and by the government of Madagascar, which issued him numerous awards and commendations throughout his career. The design for the 1,000 Malagasy franc (200 ariary) banknote first printed by the Central Bank in 1983 depicted Rakoto Frah dressed in a traditional straw hat and lamba and playing the sodina. He is the only artist to have been featured on a Malagasy banknote. According to a representative of the Central Bank, the artist was selected because he was the most representative of the Malagasy identity. After the Rakoto Frah banknote design was discontinued in the 1990s it became a rare collector's item valued in 2011 at over 100,000 ariary, more than 500 times its face value. The artist was also invited by international filmmakers to feature in two French films: the Madagascar documentary L'Ile Rouge released in 1992 by French director Jean-Michel Carré, and an eponymous documentary about the artist himself, produced by director Camille Marchand in 1997.

The legacy of Rakoto Frah remains strong over a decade after his death. In 2011, ten years after his death, a series of commemorative events were organized in Madagascar to celebrate his life and music. In May 2011 a discussion panel and debate were organized around the themes of traditional culture and heritage. In June, a Catholic mass and a half-day hira gasy performance were held in his honor and a three-day gallery exposition was organized to commemorate his life and work. Regional cabarets were organized in Mahajanga and Toamasina by his former group Feo Gasy, his sons' group Rakoto Frah Junior and traditional musical group Telofangady. September was marked by the unveiling of an opus specially composed in his honor, and a tribute concert at Mahamasina stadium featuring artists such as Dama of Mahaleo, Ricky, Samoëla and Faly Ralanto, as well as Telofangady, Rakoto Frah Junior, and Feo Gasy. On 28 October 2011 the Ministry of Culture renamed a street in the capital city after him. These events culminated in a famadihana that the artist's friends and family organized for Rakoto Frah at Ambohijatobe in Ankadinandriana. The event, which was attended by a state minister and numerous artists like Rakoto Frah Junior and Haja Telofangady, included performances by Fafah of Mahaleo, Faly, Ralanto, Ra-Jean Knack, Randrianasolo Raymond Zanany, Raozy Milalao of Toamasina and Solo Ra-Jean of Moramanga. According to custom, the remains of Rakoto Frah (affectionately called "Dadakoto" among his inner circle) were removed from the tomb to be wrapped in fresh silk shrouds. A new sodina was tucked into the cloth to replace the deteriorated one originally buried with him. The customary dish of vary be menaka (rice cooked with oil and pork) was served and musicians performed pieces of the traditional genre which the artist had so often played at the famadihana ceremonies of others.

In November 2012, several of Rakoto Frah's adult children launched the École Rakoto Frah Junior ("Rakoto Frah Junior School") initiative in November 2012 to continue the artist's work as an educator of sodina performance. The informal cultural school organized lessons in sodina performance for 50 students at the community center in the artist's former neighborhood of Isotry and awarded certificates of completion to 31 graduates on 16 December with plans to continue training further cohorts of sodina players.

== Discography ==
Title	Released	Label	Tracks (Length)
Flute Master of Madagascar	1988	Globestyle	9 (49'45")
The Art of Rakoto Frah & Randafison Sylvestre	1989/1992	JVC	6 (27'0")
A World out of Time	1992	Shanachie	18 (65'52")
A World Out of Time. Volume 2	1993	Shanachie	17 (72'46")
A World Out of Time. Volume 3	1994	Shanachie	21 (79'17")
Feo Gasy: Tsofy Rano	1996	Les Nuits Atypiques/Melodie	12 (41'54")
Souffles de Vie: Flute Sodina	1998	Musikela	– (--)
Feo Gasy: Ramano	1999	Daqui	12 (50'35")
Madagascar: Chants et Danses en Imerina	2000	Arion	13 (55'44")
