= Erick Manana =

Guitarist, singer and songwriter from Madagascar

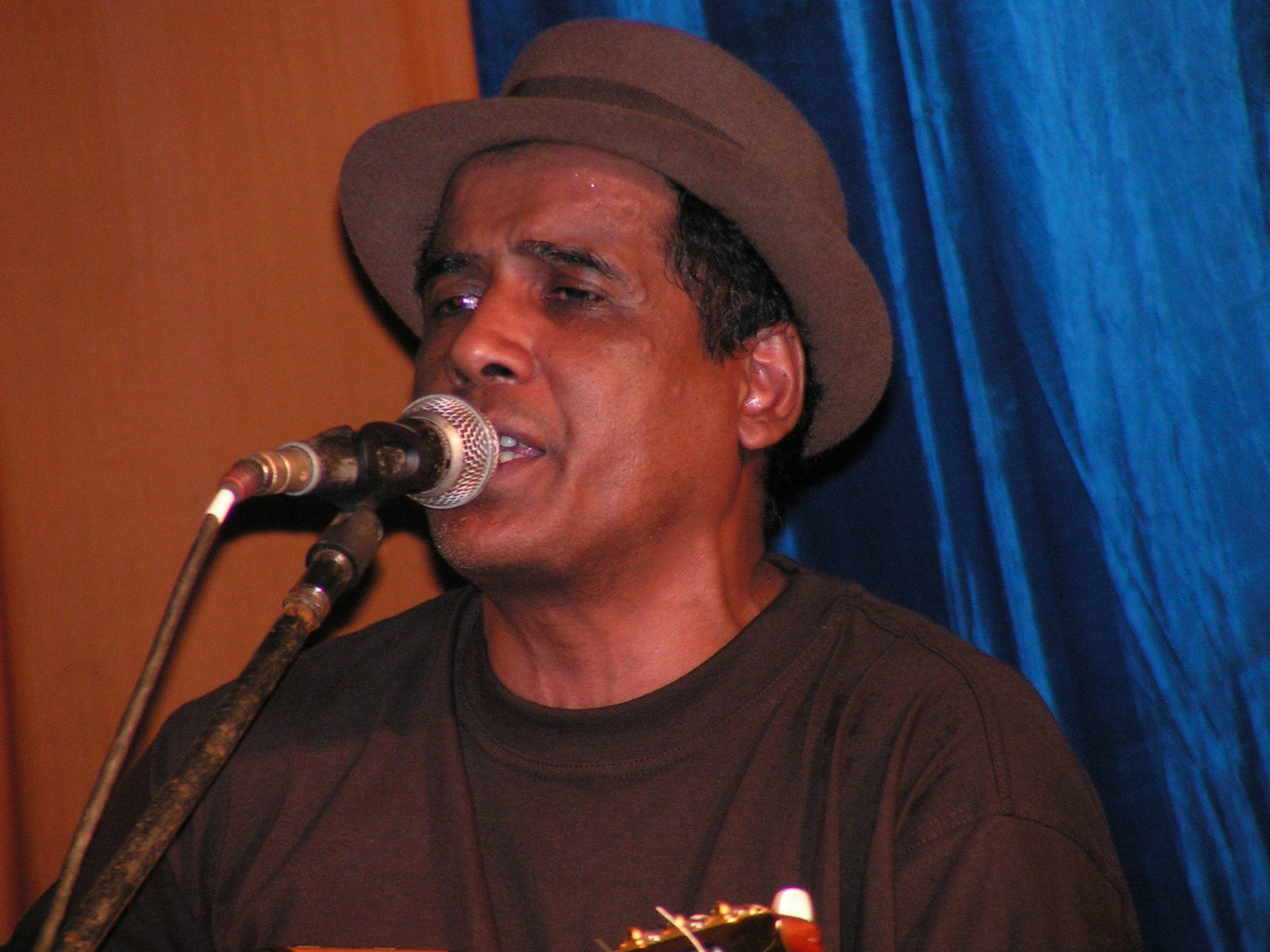

Background information
- Born: 1959 (age 66–67); Madagascar
- Genres: Ba-gasy
- Occupations: Singer, songwriter
- Instruments: Guitar, voice
- Years active: 1982–present

Erick Manana is an acoustic guitarist, singer and songwriter from Madagascar. He often performs in a duo or as a solo artist, singing in accompaniment to his acoustic guitar in the ba-gasy genre that gained prominence in the central highlands of Madagascar in the 1930s. He began to learn to play guitar and sing in the ba-gasy style from his grandfather at the age of five. In 1979, he left Madagascar to settle in France and currently lives in Bordeaux. His professional career as a musician began in 1982 as a member of Lolo sy ny Tariny. He recorded his first solo album in 1996. He was a member of the group Feo-Gasy alongside the celebrated sodina player Rakoto Frah, and together the group toured Europe several times, promoting the traditional music of the central highlands of Madagascar. He has worked on a variety of collaborative projects, recording singles and performing with established artists such as Regis Gizavo and Solorazaf, and young breakthrough stars including Aina Quash. Most recently, Manana formed a group with valiha player Justin Vali and other prominent Malagasy artists in the Malagasy All Stars. The album was conceived as a way to unite the many different groups of Madagascar, and the collaboration acts as "an olive branch to its countryfolk who sometimes are divided by these differences rather than celebrating them."

In January 2013, Manana performed at the historic Olympia venue in Paris to celebrate the 35th year of his career. At the close of the event, he was awarded the prestigious Commandeur de l'Ordre des Arts et des Lettres ("Commander of Liberal and Fine Arts") medal by the representative of the Republic of Madagascar to UNESCO.

Rootsworld described Manana as the "Bob Dylan of Madagascar", though this is more commonly said of Dama Mahaleo with whom Manana recorded a joint album titled Vaonala (2017), singing each other's hits. Manana has received several awards, including the 1994 Prix Media Adami Découvertes at the annual Radio France International global musical competition and the Grand Prix du disque de l'académie Charles Cros in 1997 for his album Vakoka.

In the 2010s and 2020s, Manana has toured solo, with his wife Jenny Fuhr, or with Malagasy artists such as the Ralah' Trio or Joel Rabesolo.

== See also ==
- Music of Madagascar
