= Madame Zo =

Malagasy weaver (1956–2020)

Zoarinivo Razakatrimo
- Madame Zo with her work
- Born: 1956
- Died: July 14, 2020
- Other name: Madame Zo
- Known for: Textile Art

Zoarinivo Razakatrimo (1956–2020) was a Malagasy textile artist, widely known by the nickname Madame Zo.

== Education ==
Madame Zo was educated at the Centre National de l'Artisanat Malagasy and trained in weaving by Andrée Ethève.

== Career ==
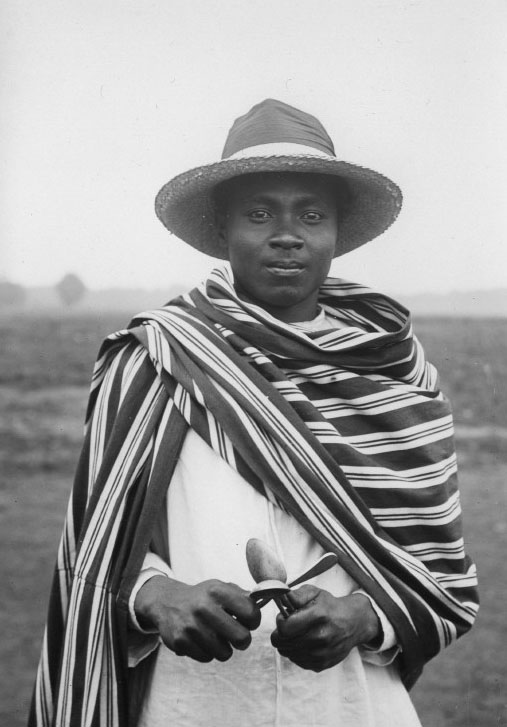
Sakalava lamba arindrano and malabary

Madame Zo's work is identifiable by its utilization of a wide array of man-made and natural materials. Working in the tradition of Malagasy lamba weaving styles, she incorporated atypical mixed media, from wood, spices, bean pods and medicinal plants to metals, newsprint, bones, stereo headphones, pens, binder clips, phone cards, spiral notebook rings. The effect is a neutral toned textile piece with three-dimensional intrusions disrupting the surface.

In 2000, she opened a boutique named Zo Artiss'.

=== Awards ===
In 2020, she won the Prix Paritana—a prize awarded annually to a Malagasy artist by Fondation H.

=== Selected solo and group exhibitions ===
In 2000 and 2002, Razakatrimo was exhibited in the Fourth and Fifth editions of the Dak'Art Biennial. In 2002, her work was exhibited in Gifts and Blessings: The Textile Arts of Madagascar at the National Museum of African Art in Washington D.C, where she is represented in the permanent collection. In 2007, she was included in the 12th International Triennial of Tapestry in Łódź, Poland 2018 her work was included in Madagascar, arts de la Grande Île, an exhibition at the Musée Quai Branly. She had solo exhibitions at Fondation H in Antananarivo in 2018 and 2023-4, respectively titled L’art au quotidien (Everyday Art) and Bientôt je vous tisse tous [Soon I will weave you all]. Her retrospective show at Fondation H presented over 90 pieces spanning 20 years of her career.

=== Selected public collections ===
Her work is in the collection of the Smithsonian Institution National Museum of African Art, and in the Fondation H Collection.

== Death ==
Madame Zo died of Covid-19 in 2020.
