= Malagasy textiles =

Traditional weaving of the Malagasy people

Malagasy textile arts flourished until around 1950. Due to varied ecology in Madagascar, many different materials were used to weave with and formed various styles of mainly striped cloth.

== Cultural impact ==
Textiles were an essential part Malagasy social and ethnic identity. Some types of cloth were imbued with supernatural powers. The Sakalava, Mahafaly, and Merina were three Malagasy cultures for which textiles played an important role in statecraft and metaphysical belief systems. Malagasy weaving was associated with women and the female identity. The relationships between weaving, the ancestors, and reburial are issues that reflect a dynamic world of spiritual power, social importance, and symbolism. A Madagascar-wise tale stated that the original union of a man and a woman, the wife brought the cloth and a mat, while the husband provided house building and agriculture. Hence, traditionally, a women's domestic skills, intelligence and industry were judged largely on her weaving.

== Lamba ==
Traditionally the primary article of clothing woven by Malagasy women was the lamba. Lamba is the term that the highlanders used, other colloquial names exist). It was created by sewing together two pieces to form a rectangle measuring around 2 m x 2.5 m. Warp created stripes adorned this cloth, with the stripes running around the waist horizontally. The Lamba was worn differently depending on the emotional and physical needs of the wearer to: protect from cold, hide timidity, show action and determination, or indicate mourning. It also served as a: blanket, apron, scarf, belt, bedding, turban, kitchen cloth, bag/ suitcase, tent/ shelter, awning, baby carrier or cradle.

== The Five Zones ==
The differences in weaving can largely be divided by weaving materials, which were indigenous to different areas and create five different weaving zone or areas. Only in one part of the areas, in the central highlands was frequent trading to acquire different materials common.

=== The East and West Coast ===
Raffia was the staple fibre of these peoples of this region who in present times are made up of the: Sihanaka, Tsimihety, Antakarana, northern Sakalava, and the Betsimisaraka. Different groups made different lengths and sizes of raffia garments, all of which were good in the rain, mud and constant humidity of the area

=== The Southeast ===
Voara family of trees beaten bark, once used by most of the island by the 19th century was considered the specialty of the southeast, along with Harefo reeds that were plaited not woven on looms. The Tanala, Antemoro people, Antambahoaka, Tefasy, Tesaka, eastern Bara people and eastern Betsileo people are the current day residents of these lands

=== The Southeast Hinterland ===
The spun bark associated the southeast could be made soft and as shimmery as silk. The Hofotra (Abutilon angulatum) species, particularly the Hafo-potsy variety, was used by the Zafimaniry and the eastern Betsileo people. This material was long process that included: fire drying the inner bark, several sessions of hours boiling bark, washing, sun drying, splitting it, tying it end to end, twisting it by rolling on the thigh, weaving it on a back strap loom and beating finished product to make it softer and shinier.

=== The South and West ===
In the arid South and West of madagascar, cotton, the prime clothing material, and wild silk were the two main fibres. This area is the home of the Bara people, southern Sakalava people, Vezo people, Masikoro, Mahafaly, Tandroy and western Tanosy. The Malagasy define silk by the type of leaves the silk worms eat, which here was the Afiafy and pisopiso trees and well as the most coveted, the tapia, in the Isalo region of Bara's territory.

=== The Central Highlands ===
The historic home of the Betsileo was indigenous to three types of fibre: Hemp, Banana stem fibre and wild silk of the Tapia trees, however these fibres were of limited distribution. This area used trade to overcome their lack and emerged as one of the most important textile production centres of Madagascar. Through trade and eventually introduction to the local area, mulberry silk emerged as one of the prominent materials of this region along with non-indigenous cotton and pigeon pea silk. The Merina had no indigenous fiber in their area and its inhabitants were prone to famine, so monarchs made it a political strategy to develop trades, particularly weaving in the area.

Cocoons collected from the wild landibe silkworm were unraveled than woven into valuable textiles called lambda mena, meaning “red silk' in the Merina kingdom. The name is a misnomer, referring to their "red" status that recalled royal prestige and ancestral authority, which in the Merina associated with the color red. These cloths were woven in many different color and pattern combinations. Worn by the aristocracy in life, these "red" textiles were also a focal point of burial, exhumation, and reburial ceremonies designed to free the dead person’s spirit from earthly death and decay.
