= Michèle Rakotoson =

Malagasy writer, journalist, and filmmaker

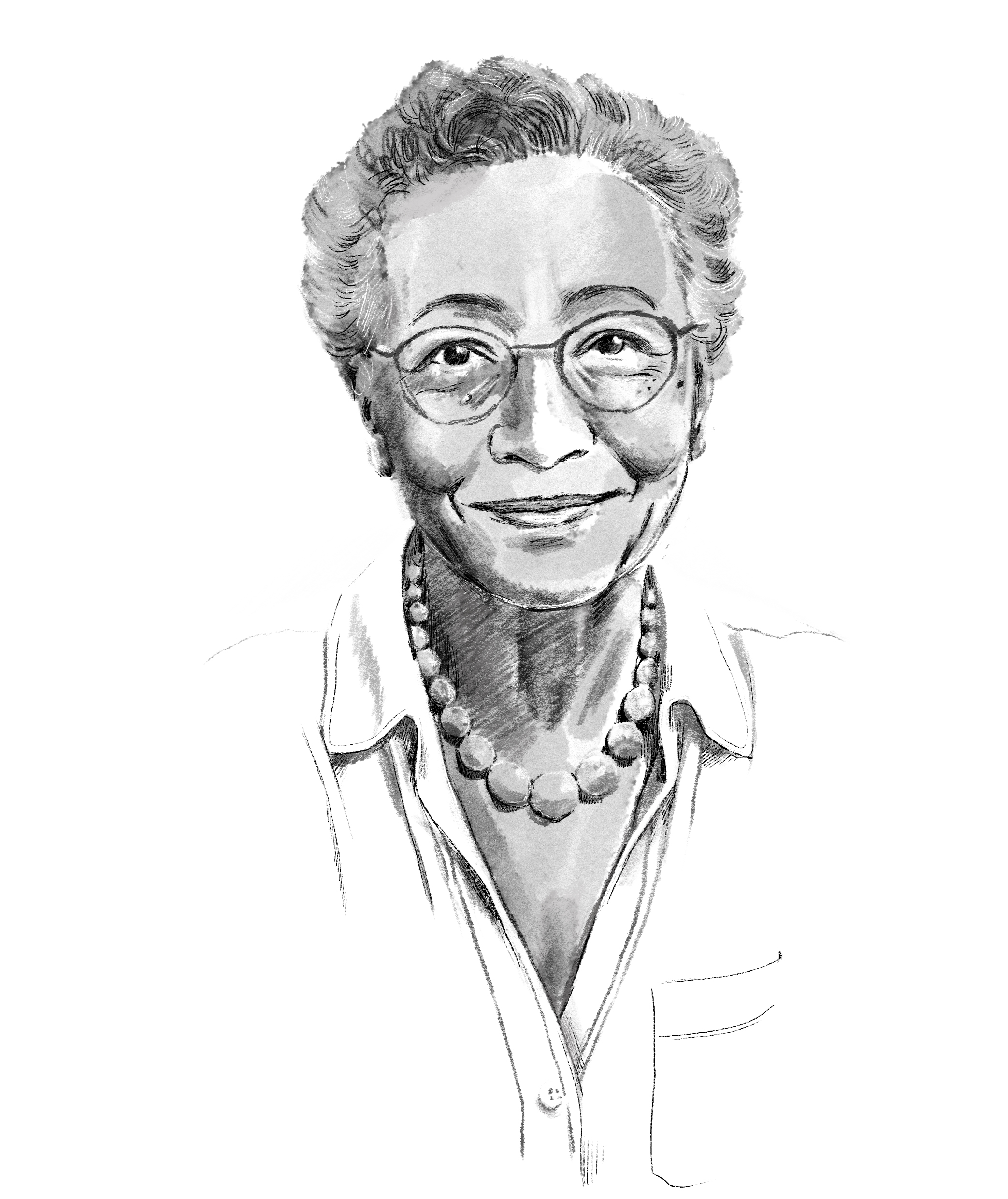
- portrait by Claire Gaudriot
- Born: June 14, 1948 (age 77); Antananarivo
- Citizenship: Madagascar
- Occupations: Journalist, playwright, writer
- Awards: Grand prix de la francophonie (2012) Prix Orange du Livre en Afrique (2023)

Michèle Rakotoson (born 1948) is a writer, journalist, and Film Maker from Madagascar. Her novels include Dadabé. Since 1983, she has lived mainly in France.

== Career ==
Michèle Rakotoson began her career in Madagascar as a literature teacher and a director. She moved to France in 1983 and earned a DEA in sociology. In Paris, she worked as a journalist for Radio France Internationale (RFI), France Culture, and La Première (French TV network). She coordinated literary events and promoted African voices in French media. In 2010 she reterned to Madagascar, and co-created the Projet Slam Jazz. She co-founded the Bokiko initiative to support young Malagasy writers. Rakotoson has been active in cultural and political advocacy both in Madagascar and France. Her work explores themes like colonization, memory, identity, and environmental justice.

== Works ==
- Dadabe: et autres nouvelles (1984) ISBN 2-86537-076-3
- Le bain des reliques: roman malgache (1988) ISBN 2-86537-218-9
- La Maison morte (The Dead House) (play, 1991)
- Elle, au printemps: roman (1996) ISBN 2-907888-64-1
- Henoÿ – Fragments en écorce (1998) ISBN 2-88253-115-X
- Lalana: roman (2002) ISBN 2-87678-783-0
- Juillet au pays: recit (2007) ISBN 978-2-91-465988-8
- Tovonay, l'enfant du Sud: roman (2010) ISBN 978-2-84280-159-5
- Passeport pour Antananarivo : Tana la belle: recit (2011) ISBN 978-2-35-639054-7
- Madame à la campagne : Chroniques malgaches (2015) ISBN 979-10-90103-24-5
- Ambatomanga, Le silence et la douleur, Édition Broche, (2022)

== See also ==
- Nicolas Vatomanga (Slam Jazz Projekt)

== Sources ==
- Hughes, A. (2001). Encyclopedia of Contemporary French Culture (Encyclopedias of Contemporary Culture). Routledge. ISBN 0-415-26354-9 – p. 247
