= David Jaomanoro =

- Born: December 30, 1953; Anivorano-Nord, Madagascar
- Died: December 7, 2014 (aged 60); Mayotte
- Education: University of Antananarivo, University of Limoges
- Writing career
- Years active: 1987-2014

David Jaomanoro (December 30, 1953 – December 7, 2014) was a Malagasy writer, playwright and poet.

== Personal life ==
Jaomanoro wrote poems until he attended university. He was a teacher in Antsiranana for ten years and then studied at the University of Antananarivo. He received a Master's Degree in Comparative Traditional Malagasy Literature from the University of Limoges in France. In 1988, he started teaching French in Antsiranana.

His works have been translated into English and Dutch.

== Death ==
Jaomanoro died on December 7, 2014, in Mayotte at the age of 60.

== Works ==
=== Novels ===
- 1987 – Quatram's j'aime ça
- 1988 - Le dernier caïman

=== Novellas ===
- 1992 – Funérailles d'un cochon et 13 autres novelles, Éditions Sepia

=== Essays ===
- 2011 – Publics d’alphabétisation à Mayotte, Éditions universitaires européennes

=== Theatre ===
- 1988 – J'ai marché dessus Radio France Internationale, édition ronéotypé12
- 1990 – La Retraite, éditions Promotion Théâtre
- 1991 – Docteur parvenu, Les Carnets de l'exotisme2
- 1997 – Joambilo, Revue Noire2
- 2006 – Pirogue sur le vide et autres nouvelles, Éditions de l’Aube
- 2013 – Le Mangeur de cactus (récit) Éditions L’Harmattan
