= Lamba (garment) =

Traditional Malagasy garment

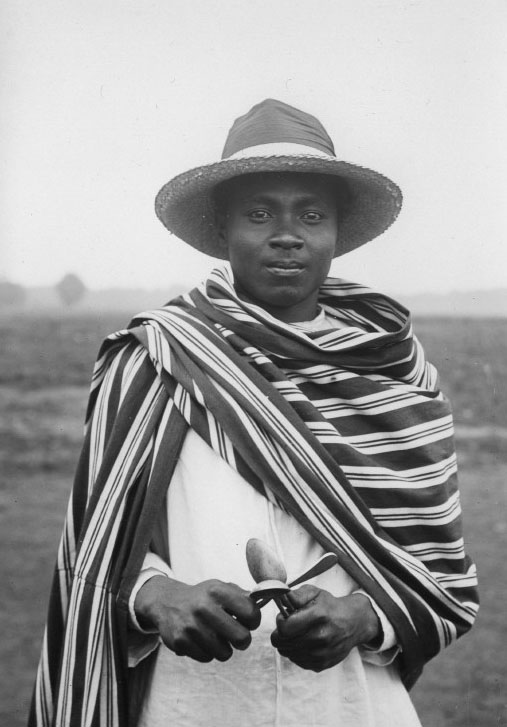
- Sakalava musician wearing a striped lamba
- Type: Wrapped garment
- Material: Silk, cotton, raffia, bast fibre; printed cotton and rayon
- Production method: Weaving on horizontal ground looms
- Place of origin: Madagascar

A lamba is the traditional garment of Madagascar: a rectangular length of cloth wrapped around the body, worn by both men and women. Highly emblematic of Malagasy culture, it varies from region to region in material, pattern, name and manner of wearing.

Besides everyday clothing, lambas are used to carry infants on the back, exchanged as gifts and used to wrap the dead. The most common type today is the printed cotton lambahoany, while the silk lamba akotofahana once worn by the Merina aristocracy has been revived as textile art.

== Materials ==
A lamba is a rectangular length of cloth wrapped around the body. Burial lambas were often made of silk, while those for daily wear were more often made of raffia, cotton or bast. Colours range from tie-dyed motifs or plain white to the red, white and black stripes found in most parts of the island; some have geometric patterns in shades of green and brown, while the brilliantly multicoloured, complex weaves were favoured by the pre-colonial Merina aristocracy. Printed cotton or rayon lambas made in India for the Malagasy market are now common alongside locally made cloth.

== In Malagasy culture ==
Merina woman in a white lamba

Lamba is the Highlands dialect name for the woven cloth that traditionally formed the essential article of clothing throughout Madagascar; in some parts of the east it is called simbo. Many terms, varying by region, describe the ways it can be wrapped.

The lamba is used to tie a child to its mother's back, freeing her hands, and when tightly coiled it serves as a cushion for carrying heavy loads on the head; it may also serve as a blanket, sheet, apron, sack, tablecloth or sunshade. Silk shrouds are used to wrap the dead before they are placed in the family tomb. Among some groups, lambas were exchanged between a man and a woman at their engagement, or offered as diplomatic gifts: in 1886 Queen Ranavalona III gave two silk lambas to President Grover Cleveland, later shown at the National Museum of African Art.

=== Types ===
Names of lambas distinguish the material, pattern, ritual purpose or intended wearer, and vary between regions; the following are among the most common.

- Lambahoany – a printed cotton lamba, similar to the kanga of eastern Africa and now the most commonly worn type. A repeated border encloses a pattern or a scene from daily life, and a proverb (ohabolana) is written above the centre of the lower border.
- Lamba akotofahana – a woven silk lamba with complex geometric designs, worn by the Merina as a shawl and used as a shroud.
- Lamba mpanjaka – a ceremonial lamba worn by nobles, the wealthy or elders.
- Lambamena – a silk burial shroud. Its name means "red lamba", but such cloths were woven in many colours; "red" refers to royal prestige and ancestral authority. Red is a common Austronesian motif associated with blood, the underworld and aristocracy, which may hark back to the Malagasy's ancestral peoples in Borneo, where peoples such as the Ngaju use similar motifs.
- Lamba arindrano – a blend of silk and cotton.
- Jabo-landy – a blend of silk and raffia.
- Laimasaka – a Sakalava raffia lamba with geometric ikat patterns, often used as a shroud.
- Salaka – a loincloth about 30 centimetres (12 in) wide and 3 metres (10 ft) long.

=== Ways of wearing ===
Both sexes wrap the lamba around the waist like a sarong. Women also wrap it over or beneath the bust as a sheath dress, often with a matching headdress. Men may drape it over one shoulder as a shawl, over shorts or a malabary, a long-sleeved knee-length cotton tunic. It is traditionally draped over the left shoulder, and over the right in mourning. Among mature Merina and, to a lesser extent, Betsileo women, a narrow white lamba worn around the shoulders is a mark of "elegance, dignity, femininity and respect for tradition". Narrow lambas may also be worn as a sash, a fashion popularised by European influence and typical of hiragasy performers.

== Production ==
Traditional lambas were most often woven on horizontal ground looms, the most common type of loom in Madagascar, by a woman seated to one side of the loom. For many women, weaving was a domestic duty to clothe the family; surplus could be sold, most often among the Merina and Betsileo of the Highlands.

== As art ==
The colourful lamba akotofahana associated with the Merina aristocracy (andriana) uses extra heddles on the loom to create raised bands of pattern. Under colonial rule the same patterns were woven white-on-white, drawing less attention to the class and ethnic identity they expressed. These designs are still woven in white-on-white, and colourful 19th-century designs have been revived, mainly for export.

Contemporary weavers have revived these techniques. The Metropolitan Museum of Art acquired Lamba mpanjaka marevaka ("king's bright mantle", 1998) by Martin Rakotoarimanana, who studied historical cloths in the British Museum. The American Museum of Natural History displayed a textile in this style woven entirely from the silk of the golden orb-weaver spider. The artist Madame Zo incorporates the traditions of lamba weaving into her textile art.

== Gallery ==
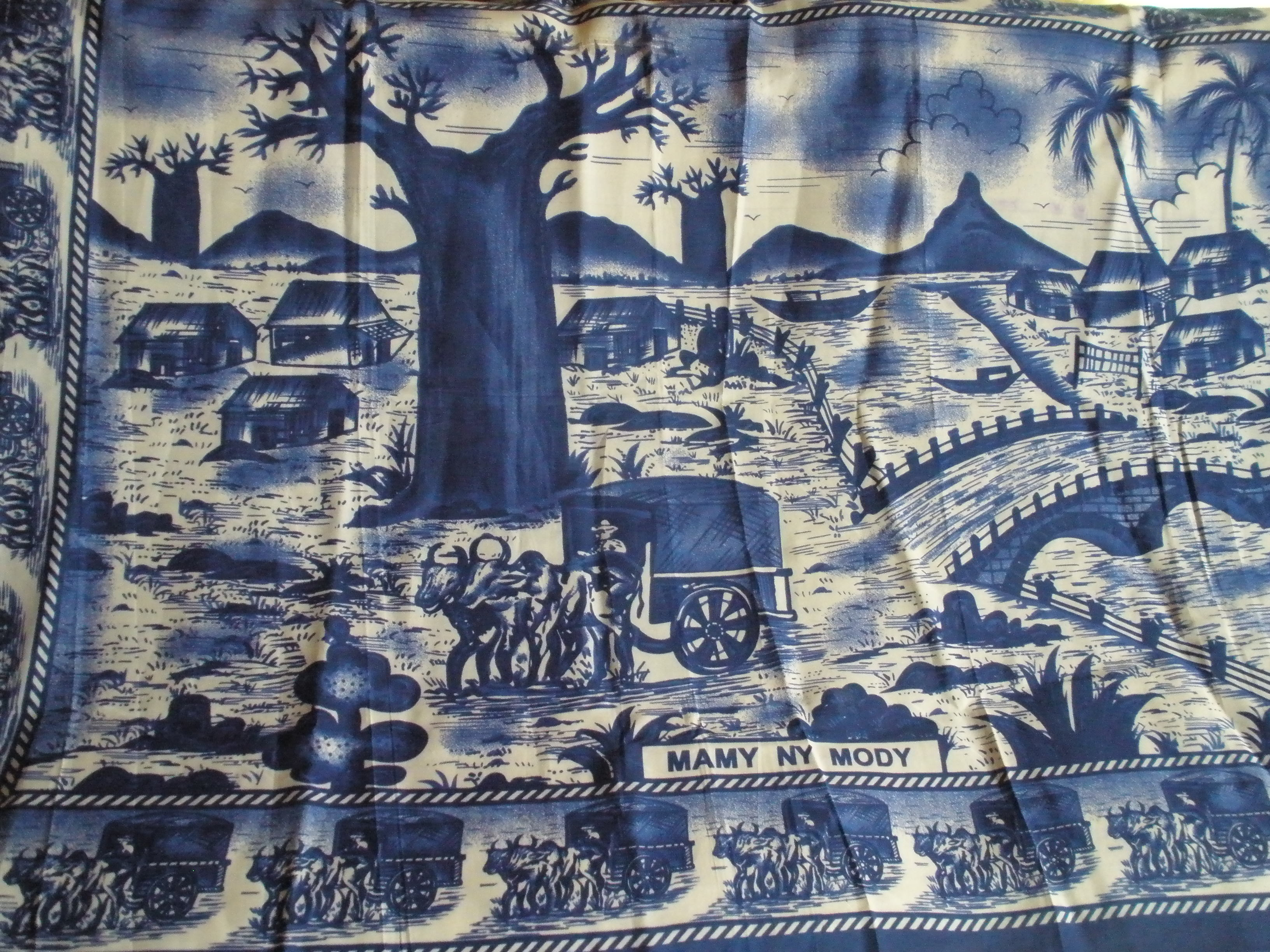
Lambahoany reading "Coming home is lovely"

Lambahoany with scenes of daily life

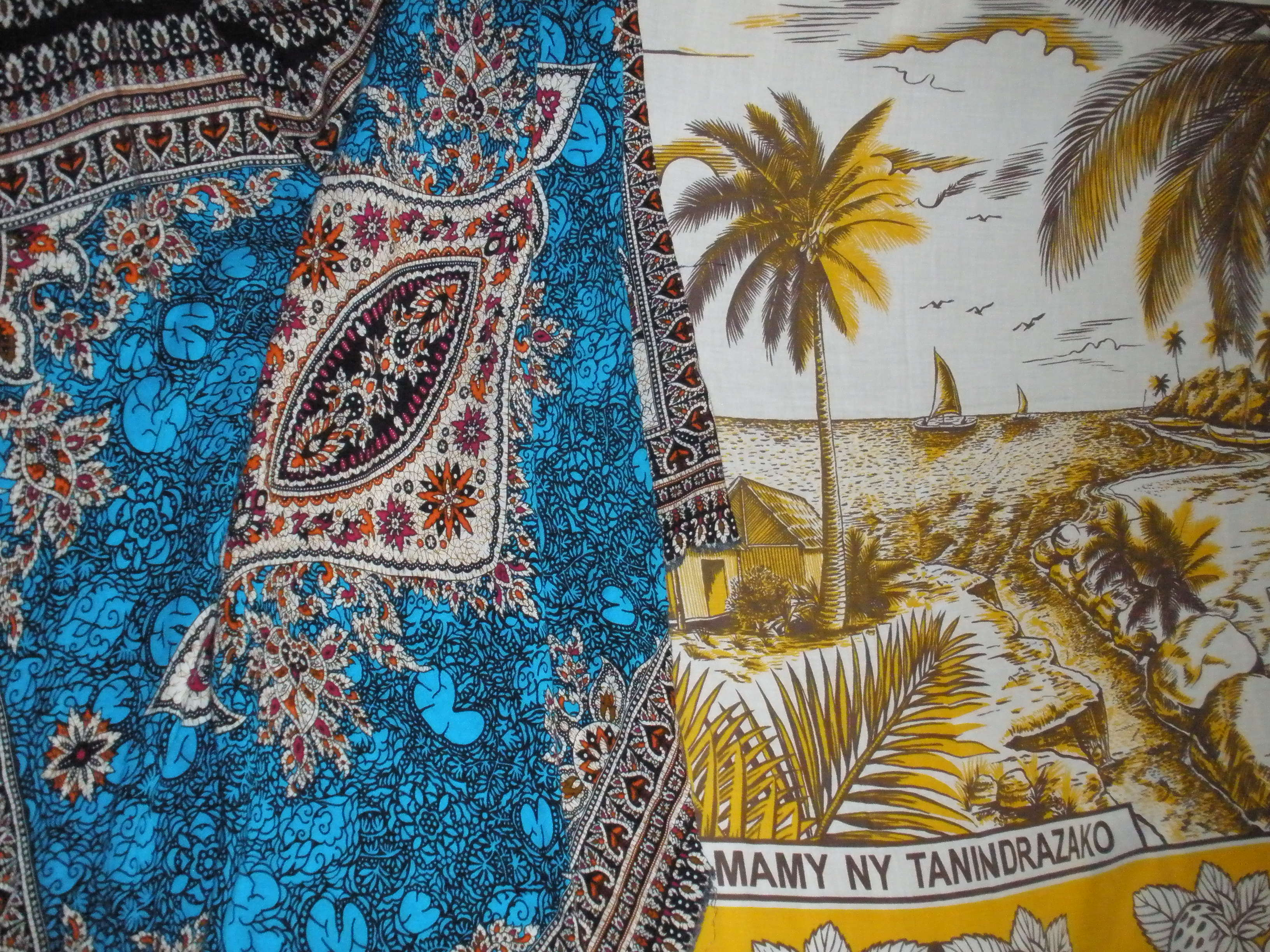
Asian prints in a coastal town

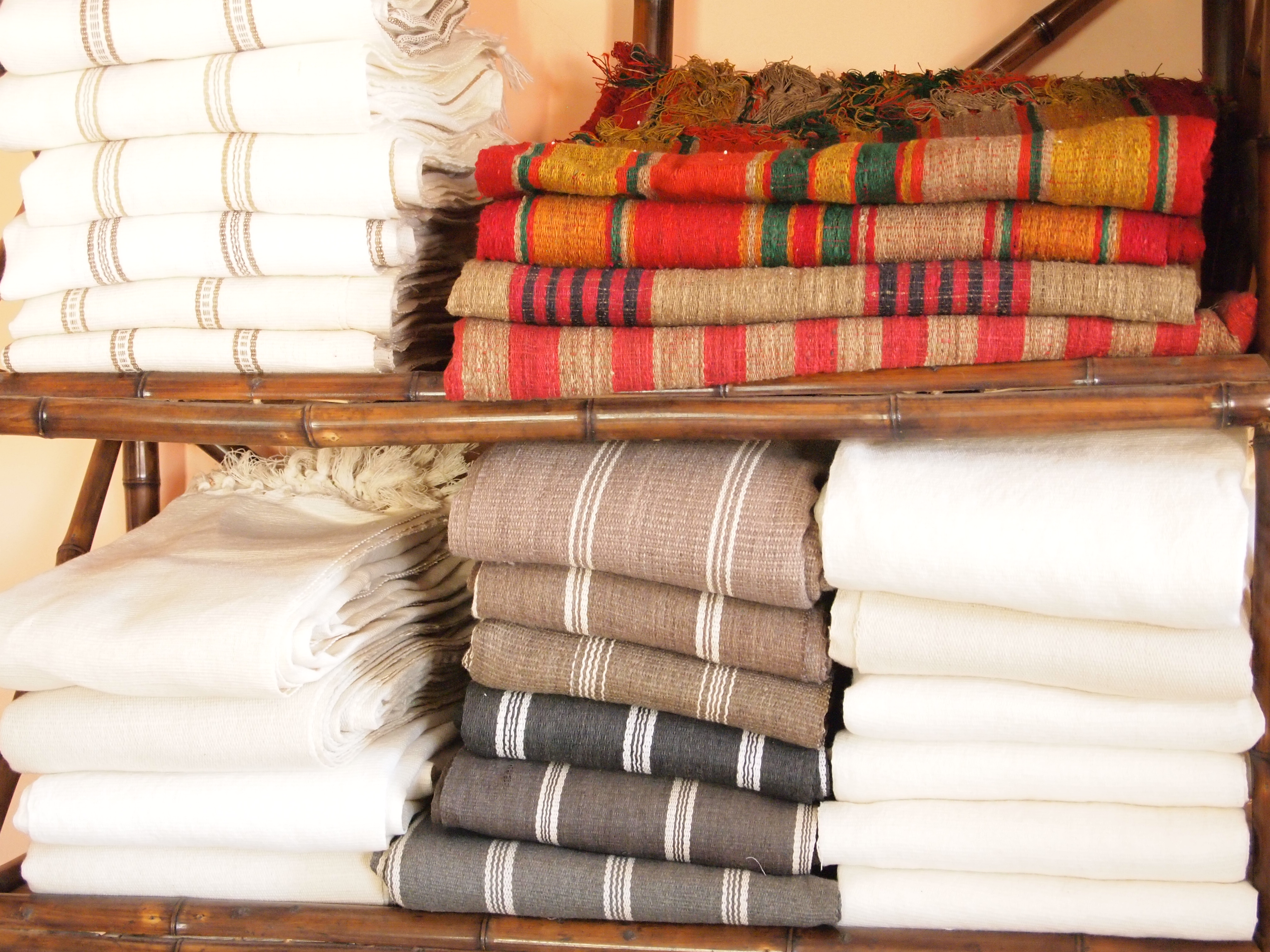
Lambas in a shop

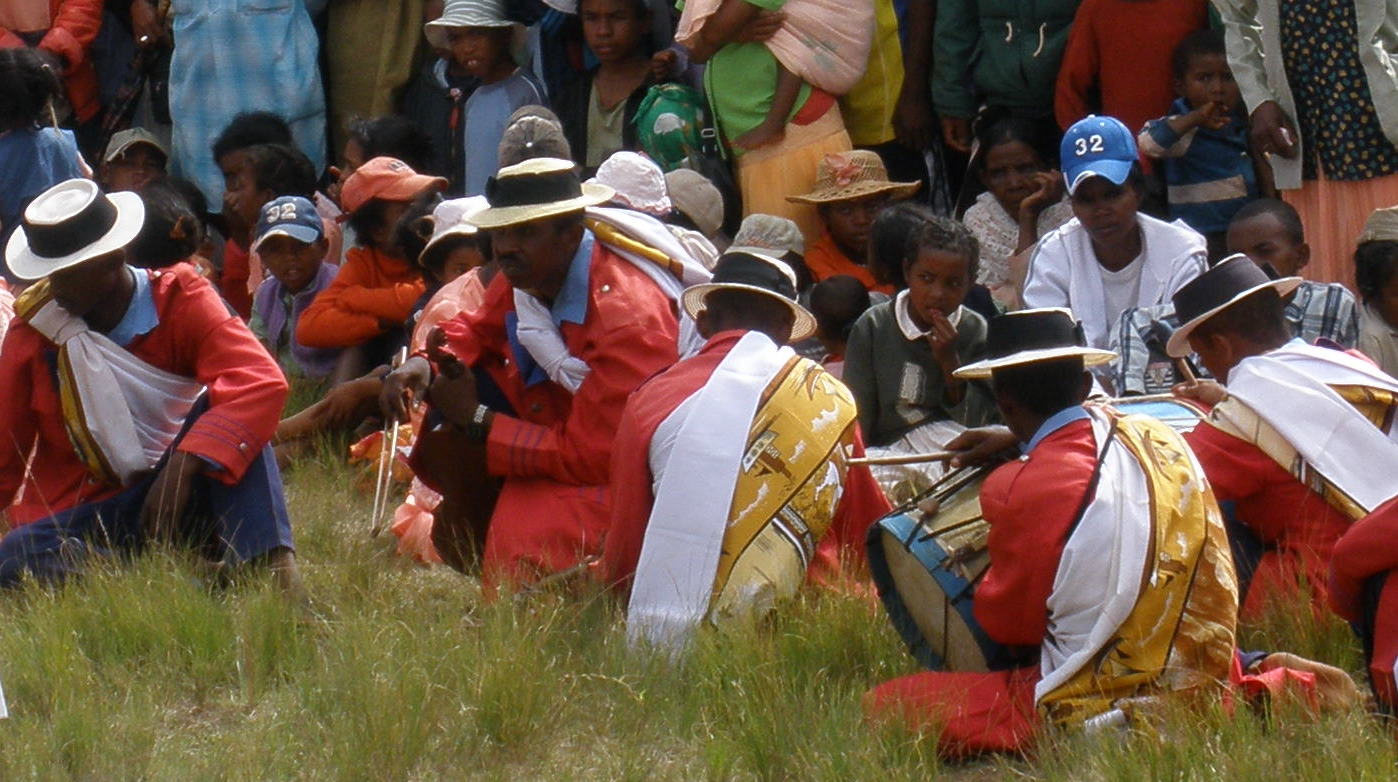
Hiragasy musicians in matching lambas

== See also ==
- Malagasy textiles
- Feather cloak
