= Angavo (mountain) =

Mountain in Madagascar

Coordinates: 23.2333°S 46.9500°E

Angavo is a mountain in southeastern Madagascar.

== Overview ==
The Angavo mountain also known as the Great Cliff or the Cliff of Angavo frequently gets impossible to travel on or through with Betsimisaraka Escarpment standing next to it, a second and lower cliff to the east, which slopes down to the coastal plain. It has an elevation of 1,248 metres. Angavo is situated north of Andalanimanga. An ancient lake called the Lake Alaotra is located at the foot of the massive escarpment. The south is occupied by the Mahafaly and the Androy plateaus forming precipitous cliffs hanging over the sea. The west transforms into a big expanse of steps and the central plateau is again challenged by an impassable escarpment called the Cliff of Bongolava. The Mount Ambohitra stands in the extreme north with a number of volcanic craters.
