= Jean-Luc Raharimanana =

Malagasy novelist, essayist, poet, and playwright (born 1967)

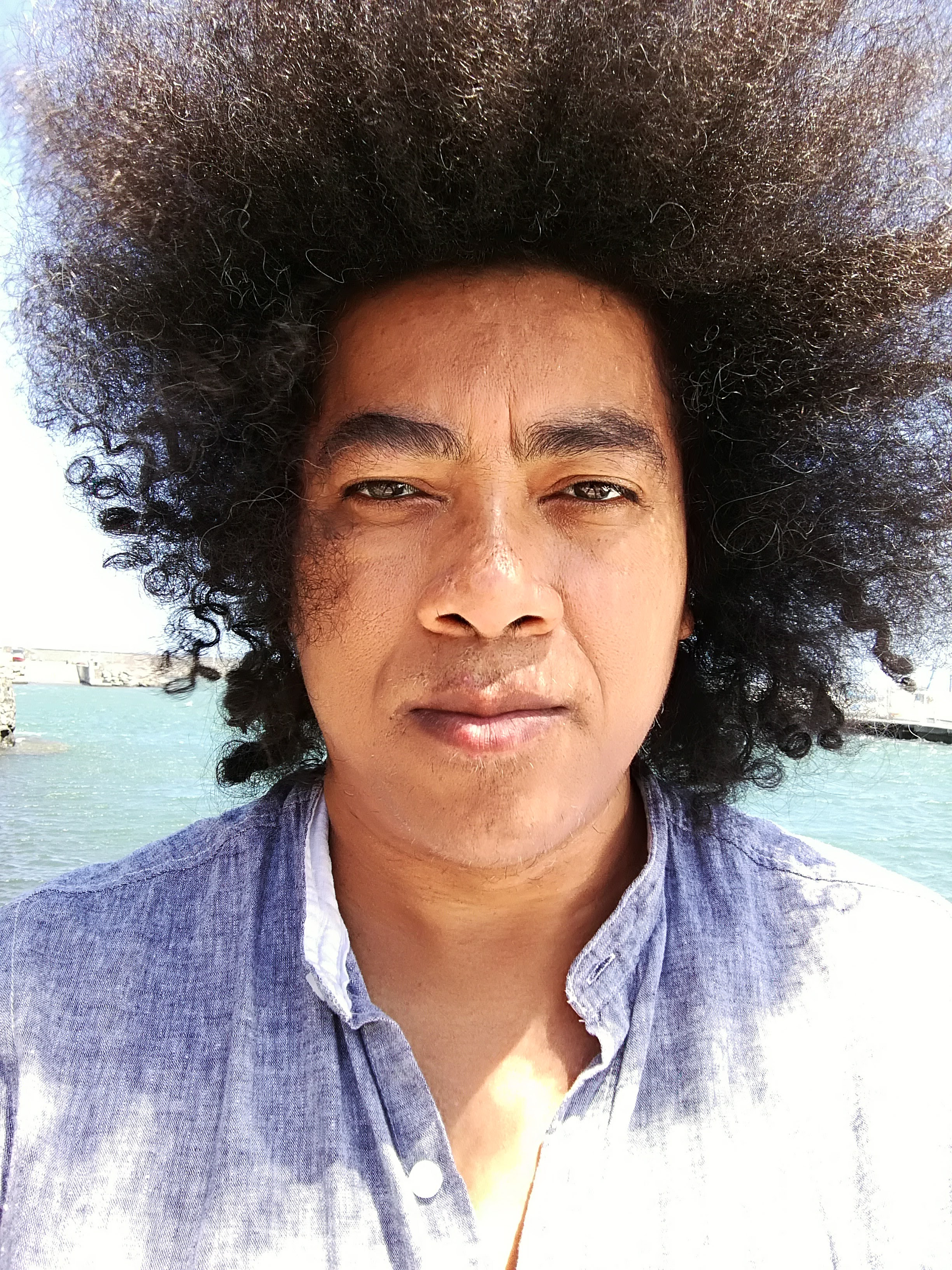
- Jean Luc Raharimanana (2017)
- Born: June 26, 1967 (age 59); Antananarivo, Madagascar
- Education: University of Antananarivo, University of Paris, Institut National des langues et civilisations orientales
- Writing career
- Language: French, Malagasy
- Years active: 1989-present
- Notable awards: Jean-Joseph Rabearivelo Award for Poetry, Tardivat International Award For Best French Language Fiction, Tchicaya-U'Tamsi Prize, Great Fiction Prize of Madagascar

Jean-Luc Raharimanana (born June 26, 1967, Antananarivo, Madagascar) is a Malagasy novelist, essayist, poet, and playwright.

== Personal life ==
He wrote his first book in his native country, but he was unable to publish it because of the political situation. He went to France to study ethnolinguistics at the University of Paris and the Institut National des langues et civilisations orientales following his graduation from the University of Antananarivo in 1989, due to a stipendium he received from the RFI.

After completing his studies in France, Raharimanana went on to work as a journalist and French teacher.

In his works, Raharimanana often describes the situation of poverty and corruption and the history in his homeland in a violent and lyrical style. Several of his screenplays have been adapted for theatre and he is the subject of the 2004 documentary Gouttes d’encre sur l’île rouge.

Raharimanana's works have been translated into German, English, Italian, and Spanish. Raharimanana currently lives in Paris.

== Selected works ==
His first play "Le prophète et le président" won the Tchicaya-U'Tamsi Prize in 1990, awarded by the Inter-African theatre competition, but the theatre performance was banned by Madagascar's government owing to the political nature of the play.

In June 2002, Raharimana's father Vénance Raharimanana, a history professor at the University of Antananarivo, was tortured and subsequently arrested following a radio program he hosted that dealt with the pre-colonial tension in Madagascar. He writes about the experience in his short story collection L'arbre anthropophage.

== Bibliography ==
=== Novellas ===
- Le lépreux et dix-neuf autres nouvelles. Paris: Hatier, 1992.
- Lucarne. Paris: Le Serpent à plumes, 1996.
- Rêves sous le linceul. Paris: Le Serpent à plumes, 1998.

=== Children's books ===
- Landisoa and the three pebbles. Illustrations by Jean A. Ravelona. Vanves: Édicef / Hachette, 2001.

=== Novels ===
- Za. Paris: Philippe Rey, 2008.
- Nour, 1947. Paris: Le Serpent à Plumes, 2001; La Roque d’Anthéron: Vents d’Ailleurs, 2017.
- Revenir. Paris: Rivages, 2018.

=== Stories ===
==== Collections ====
- L’Arbre anthropophage. Paris: Gallimard/Joëlle Losfeld, 2004.
- Tsiaron’ny nofo. Îlle-sur-Tête: K’A, 2008.

==== Stories contributed to collections ====
- "Anja" in Une enfance outremer. Paris: Seuil, 2001.
- "Prosper" in Dernières nouvelles de la Françafrique. La Roque d’Anthéron: Vents d’Ailleurs, 2003.
- "Corps en jachère" in Nul n’est une île: Solidarité Haïti. Montréal: Mémoire d’encrier, 2004.
- "Sortir des bois" in Africultures 59 (Second Trimester 2004)
- "Le vol de La Tempête" in Enfances. Bertoua (Cameroun): Ndzé, 2006; Paris: Ndzé (Pocket), 2008.
- "Za" in Le huitième péché, collectif coordonné par Kangni Alem. Bertoua (Cameroun): Éditions Ndzé, 2006.
- "Pacification" in Dernières nouvelles du colonialisme (Collectif). La Roque d’Anthéron: Vents d’Ailleurs, 2006.
- "Le creuset des possibles" in Pour une littérature-monde, sous la direction de Michel Le Bris et Jean Rouaud. Paris: Gallimard, 2007.
- "Sur le bord des lèvres" in Riveneuve Continents 5 (Autumn 2007)
- "De là où j’écris" in Riveneuve Continents 10 (Winter 2009-2010)

=== Poetry ===
- Les cauchemars du gecko. La Roque d’Anthéron: Vents d’Ailleurs, 2011.
- Enlacement(s). Coffret de trois livres: Des Ruines, Obscena et Il n’y a plus de pays. La Roque d’Anthéron: Vents d’Ailleurs, 2012.
- Empreintes. La Roque d’Anthéron: Vents d’Ailleurs, 2015.

=== Academic publications ===
- La littérature malgache. Interculturel Francophonies (Lecce, Italie) 1 (June–July 2001)
- Identités, langues et imaginaires dans l’Océan Indien. Interculturel Francophonies 4 (November–December 2003)
- Jacques Rabemananjara. Interculturel Francophonies 11 (June–July 2007)
- Les Comores, une littérature en archipel (co-authored with Magali Nirina Marson). Interculturel Francophonies 19 (June–July 2011)

== Theatre adaptations ==
Title	Producer	Premiered
Lépreux	RFI	1990
Le prophète et le président	Christiane Ramanantsoa (Madagascar), Vincent Mambatchaka (Benin, Togo, Senegal, Ivory Coast, Central Africa, France	1993
Le puits	Maison du Geste et de l’Image, TILF, Théâtre de la Villette	1997
Le Tambour de Zanahary	Twamay Association	2000
La Femme, la dinde, les deux compères et la bouteille	Frédéric Robin	2004
Milaloza	Bernadette Baratier and Laure-Marie Legay (Burkina Faso, Mali, France, Niger)	2004
Lemahery et le caméléon	Fabrice (Faffa) Andriamilantonirinason and Jean Ramanambita	2006
47	Revue Frictions	2008
Les Cauchemars du Gecko	Thierry Bedard	2010
Des Ruines... la liesse et l’oubli	Thierry Bedard	2010
Parfois le vide	Jean-Luc Raharimanana	2016

== Film adaptations ==
Title	Director	Year
Gouttes d’encre sur l’île rouge	Randianina Ravoajanahary, Vincent Wable	2004

== Awards ==
- 1987 - Jean-Joseph Rabearivelo Award for Poetry
- 1989 - Tardivat International Award For Best French Language Fiction
- 1990 - Tchicaya-U'Tamsi Prize for African Poetry
- 1998 - Great Fiction Prize of Madagascar (ADELF), for Rêves sous le linceul.
- 2011 - Salon du Livre insulaire de Ouessant Poetry Award, for Les cauchemars du gecko.
- 2018 - Prix Jacques Lacarrière for Revenir.
