= Hiragasy =

Musical tradition in Madagascar

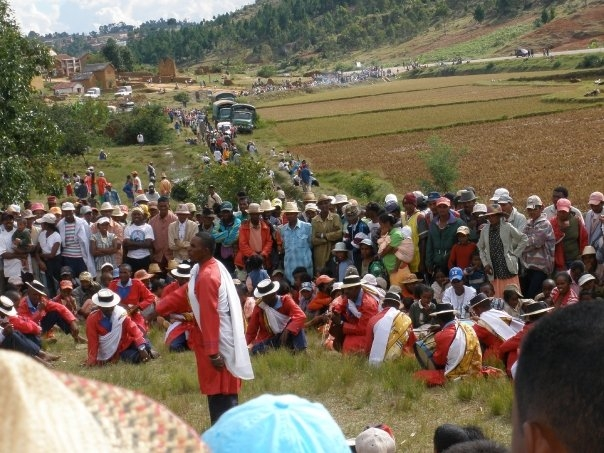
- Hiragasy performance near Ampefy, Madagascar, in July 2008.
- Medium: Music, dance, and kabary oratory
- Originating culture: Merina people
- Originating era: 18th century–present

Hiragasy, a performing art of the Central Highlands of Madagascar
- UNESCO Intangible Cultural Heritage
- Country: Madagascar
- Reference: 01740
- Region: Africa

Inscription history
- Inscription: 2023 (18th session)
- List: Representative

Hiragasy or hira gasy (hira: song; gasy: Malagasy) is a musical tradition in Madagascar, particularly among the Merina ethnic group of the Highland regions around the capital of Antananarivo. It is a day-long spectacle of music, dance, and kabary oratory performed by a troupe (typically related by blood or marriage and of rural origin) or as a competition between two troupes.

== Origins and history ==
The tradition in its contemporary form began in the late 18th century when Merina prince Andrianampoinimerina first used musicians to draw a crowd for his political speeches (kabary); these troupes became independent, and began to incorporate political commentary and critique in their performances. The audience plays an active role at hiragasy events, expressing their satisfaction with the talent of the troupe members and the message they proclaim through applause, cheers or sounds of disapproval. Hiragasy troupes were used during the French colonial administration to communicate decrees and other information to the rural population in the Highlands, and as such troupe members were exempt from the forced labor requirements imposed on all other Malagasy.

After independence from France in 1960, the hiragasy troupe was held up as an icon of traditional Malagasy culture, and began to find greater popularity along the coasts, although performances remain largely concentrated in the Highlands. Aspiring politicians routinely hire hiragasy troupes to attract a crowd for their political speeches while campaigning. While most troupes remain apolitical, some have opted to throw their support behind particular candidates to spectacular effect, as when former hiragasy member-cum-popstar Rossy authored his 1995 song "Lera." The song was critical of the Zafy regime and was picked up by hiragasy troupes, who performed it across the island; the popularity of this song played a key role in mobilizing popular support for Zafy's impeachment. The most famous troupe is Ramilison Fenoarivo, Rossy's former troupe and staunch supporter of ex-President Didier Ratsiraka.

== Structure and performance ==
The performance of the hiragasy follows a number of conventions, such that there are certain similarities between the 80+ troupes currently performing in Madagascar. Among these are the order in which songs, dances and oratory are performed; how troupes are named (after the last name of the founding member and his/her town of origin); what costumes are worn (men typically wear straw hats, red coats and pants inspired by 19th century French military garb, and matching lamba cloth sashes; women wear identical dresses designed after the style popular among ladies of the court during the Imperial period); and which instruments are used. Traditional instruments are not common at hiragasy performances, due to the origins of the performance with the royal court, where European influences reigned. Instead, the most common instruments are violins, trumpets, and snare and bass drums; the sodina, accordion, kabosy or clarinet may occasionally make an appearance.

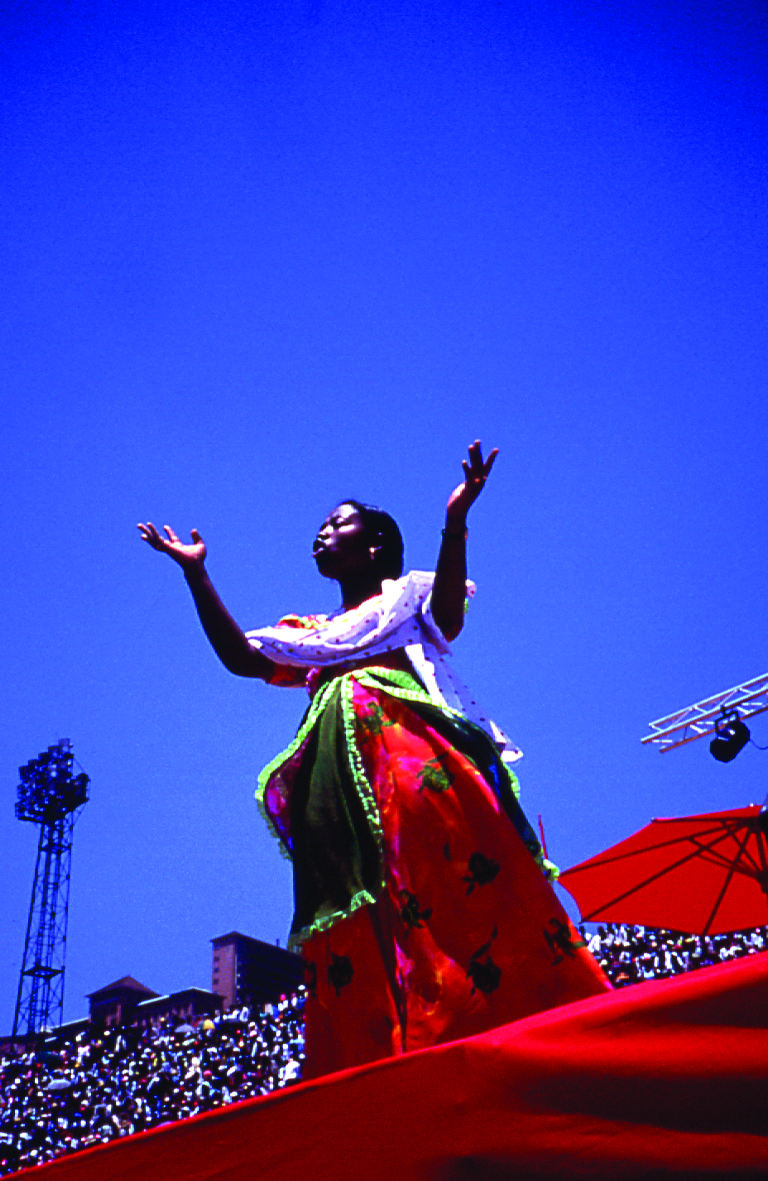
Celebrated artist Raholiarisoa performing hiragasy at Mahamasina Stadium, Antananarivo

Hiragasy follow a specific structure under the direction of the troupe leader who is often the oldest member and responsible for the presentation of kabary.
1. The Sasitehaka: Over the course of approximately ten minutes, the male members of the troupe settle in the middle of the crowd of spectators as the snare and base drummers beat an accompanying militaristic rhythm. The women are often to the side, completing their wardrobe and makeup.
2. The Mpikabary (Making Kabary): One of the artists, often the troupe leader or oldest member of the group, will typically take off his straw hat and formally announce the beginning of the spectacle. He will invite the female members of the troupe to come to the stage and then, after a short instrumental performance, the artist will take about five minutes to introduce the theme (indray miditra) of the show through kabary - a traditional type of formalized and poetic speech incorporating ohabolana (proverbs).
3. The Renihira (Queen Song): The singers of the group form a circle facing outward and sing in harmony on the selected theme while the musicians, seated to the side, accompany them. This theme is explored and developed at length, often for more than an hour, and the singers punctuate their message with emphatic hand gestures and facial expressions.
4. The Dihy (Dance): The singers take a seat on the ground while the musicians play behind one, two or several dancers who will perform for approximately 15 minutes. A kabary (kabarindihy) is presented on the topic of the dance to be performed and announces the title of the song that accompanies it. There are two typical forms of dance that may be performed. The true Dihy is typically performed by two dancers and the style is often acrobatic or takes its inspiration from martial arts. The Tsikandihy or Dihy Irery is typically performed by one male dancer, occasionally accompanied by a female dancer. The dancing segment is concluded with another short kabary that again touches on the theme of the performance and introduces the final part.
5. The Zanakira or Vakodrazana: A short performance lasting approximately 20 minutes that concludes the spectacle.

When two or more troupes are competing, each troupe takes its turn at each stage before all proceed to the next stage of the performance. The troupes may all complete the entire cycle (this first round is termed the Vakisehatra) before repeating the entire process in a second round with a new set of themes (the second round being known as the Adi-Kiha) before all conclude with the Vakodrazana. In these competitive performances, troupes may have as many as three or more themes to explore and the competition may last from early morning until nightfall.
