= Solorazaf =

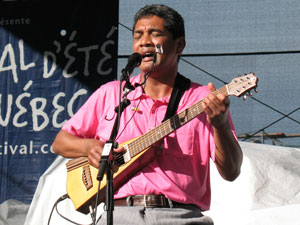

Background information
- Born: Solo Razafindrakoto
- Origin: Madagascar
- Genres: Traditional music, folk
- Instrument: Guitar
- Labels: Indie

Solo Razafindrakoto known as Solorazaf is a Malagasy guitarist born in France. His roots are both situated in Madagascar. His musical style is very much influenced by these two different cultures and he then created a very personal musical style based on Malagasy traditional music.

== Biography ==
Solorazaf was born in Montpellier of Malagasy parents, but left for the Big Island when he was six months old. Although he visited France regularly, he grew up in Madagascar, in the village of his grandparents, in contact with the traditional music of the Highlands. He began playing the guitar at 12, and turned professional at 17, playing with rock groups which were already including local instruments.

At the age of seventeen, he was one of the first studio musicians in the capital city of Antananarivo. At Discomad Studio, the only recording studio on the main Island.¹

In a country where the music is as rich and vital as its flora and fauna, Solorazaf plays guitar, bass and drums on recordings for different artists from the various regions across Madagascar.

Solo (pronounced 'Sool') was 22 when, in 1978, he chose to settle in France where he has since had a double career as a musician and producer. He first accompanied Graeme Allwright until 1983, then Dizzy Gillespie and Miriam Makeba, created the group Namana (short-lived, but which produced an album), and handled the arrangements and artistic direction of the most recent albums of the author of "Jour de clarté." All this while travelling the world with his own compositions (in Boston, in the US, he was called the "revelation" of the L'Air du temps festival in 1995 and 1996).

In 1979, he moved to Paris and quickly established himself as an in-demand accompanist and session player contributing to the music of many great French recording artists in various styles of pop and world music. ¹

From 1998, Solorazaf plays with the quartet “Worlds of Guitar”. The group includes guitar masters Fareed Haque, Romero Lubambo and Aquiles Baez. During this busy period, however, Solorazaf was also the lead guitarist for the legendary Miriam Makeba. Solorazaf travels the globe touring for 15 years with Makeba. The world tours include among others “Live the future” with Makeba and Dizzy Gillespie, “The Three Divas Tour” with Miriam Makeba, Nina Simone and Odetta as well as “The USA Tour:Tour of Hope” with Hugh Masekela and Miriam Makeba.

In 2001, Solorazaf begins touring his “Solo Guitar Performance”. He plays Europe, the US and Canada. His solo concerts are widely acclaimed in the US and Europe and according to a lot of world guitar press magazines, he establishes himself as one of the most innovative solo guitar player's on the World scene.

He appears every year at the concert Autour de la Guitare created by Jean-Félix Lalanne in 2001.

His solo concerts are widely acclaimed in the US and Europe and he establishes himself as one of the most innovative solo guitar player's on the world scene.

Solorazaf's songs are sung in his native tongue Malagasy, or French, sometimes a combination of the two, at times with a bit of English thrown in.²

Solorazaf also found time to create a music school called “Guitares Alliées”, (“Allied Guitars”). The school is created in partnership with The Alliance Francaise in the city of Antsirabe (south of Tananarive). The school is a place of theory and practice where the students improve their skills through a variety of instruction and documentation as well as through the help of audio-visual tools that Solorazaf has collected from guitarists-friends throughout the world.

== His guitars ==
"My favourite instruments are a walnut guitar with seven strings, composed of six strings on which is added a seventh one, a bass E string, in order to play the bass lines, because as I former bass player this is essential to me. And I also like my 'little' guitar, tuned in C, a very inspiring open tuning which allows me to play Malgasy music.

These instruments have been built two luthiers called A. and D. Hamel. I met them in Montreal for I used to go there very often. One day, I found a Semi-acoustic guitar. They make improved travel guitar or Silent guitar, a little bit like the gibsons. They are adapted to my way of playing. Thanks to these guitars I was able to get back the sound of Malagasy instruments like for example a short lute.

And I play another guitar called 'bigbee', which I made myself, tuned with one half in C, and another half in G and which sounds nicely with my open tuning.

I also use the footoy which is a kind of drums played with the feet. I invented it in order to get a good stability.

When I came back to Paris, I called on my friend Christophe, a guitarist, and I turned them into Electric acoustic guitar because at first they already had a nice sound. These instruments really shows my soul.

But I have had common guitars like Stratocasters or Gibsons."³

== Critics ==
One-man band, Solorazaf illuminates the stage by his presence and by the sounds he produces with his mouth, his feet and even his nostrils. And of course with his guitar with which he is a virtuoso. His presence is a delight.⁵

The Paris Magazine Sortie describes Solorazaf's voice as “sweet as a dream”.

“Solo guitar illuminated by cascading traditional Malgache rhythms”. -- Télérama (Paris, France)

“Highly recommended”—New York Times (USA)

“An musical inventor with the Malgache traditions at its foundation.”—International guitar Festival of Rueil Malmaison - France

“One of the greatest performers I’ve ever seen on any string instrument anywhere… Phenomenal! -- Elombe Brath (Producer/Mediahost/African affairs consultant) “Solorazaf is simply superbe and magnificent” -Afropop – New York City (USA)

“A master of the 12/8 Salegy rhythm”—Acoustic Guitar Magazine.

Awarded a "CHOC" and three stars by Le Monde de la musique.

== Discography ==
Parallel to his own personal performance projects, Solorazaf also produced several albums considered by the specialized press as essential to Malagasy music.

- Fruits du Voyages
- Souffles de Vie Rakoto Frah.
- Razilinah by Erick Manana.
- Toamasina sérénades Daniel Tombo

He also creates and co-produces: “Bilo” Malagasy connection with E.Manana, Nawal, Justin Vali.

- 1993 Guitare à balanciers. (a concept which pulls together the musics of Madagascar, folk blues and French chanson).
- 1999 9 pieces of bizarre.

( It is a solo voyage of lyrical guitar and voice: melodies and modulations tangled with propulsive, throbbing rhythms accompanied by a simple shaker or foot percussion.)

- 1999 3 rays of Rain.( This music shows off his ever-evolving style and originality).
- 1992 Malgache Connexion.(auvidis)
- 1996 Fruits du voyage.(mélodie)
- 1997 The moon and the banana tree.
- 2006 DVD Live "Rendez Vous A Melting Point"
