= Ibonia =

Epic poem of Madagascar

The Ibonia is an epic poem that has been told in various forms across the island of Madagascar for at least several hundred years. The Ibonia predates the introduction of the printing press in Madagascar in the early part of the 19th century and as such has long been part of the poetic and storytelling oral traditions of the island. The first known transcription of the story was recorded in the 1870s and rapidly gained canonical status in the African literary tradition, being reprinted in numerous collections across Europe.

== Plot ==
The tale begins with the conception and birth of Ibonia (Iboniamasiboniamanoro or "he of the clear and captivating glance") who demands to be betrothed to Iampelasoamananoro ("Girl of Grace") while still in the womb of his mother, Beautiful-Rich. Before they can be married, however, Iampelasoamananoro is taken away by Revato ("Stone Man"). Before setting off to win her back, he engages in a verbal duel with Great Echo and beats him. Great Echo in return offers Ibonia advice on how to pass a series of tests that will confront him on his quest to regain his wife. Ibonia visits his parents before setting off on the quest and his mother spurs him to prove himself by successfully fighting a series of powerful animal and human adversaries. She then attempts to dissuade him from his quest by presenting him with other wives, which he refuses. Ibonia displays his wit and physical prowess to overcome the challenges he encounters, including dressing himself in an Old Man's skin to get closer to Stone Man and Joy-Giving girl until his unprecedented talent for playing the valiha (a traditional bamboo tube zither) and fanorona (a traditional game played with stones on a board) gives him away. Ibonia wins his confrontation with Stone Man and escapes with Joy-Giving Girl. The two remain married for about ten years before the relationship is ended by Ibonia's peaceful death.

== Variations ==
Three similar versions of the story as described above were collected by folklorists in the 1870s. However, six distinct versions in total have been recorded by folklorists and the variation from the base story increases with the distance from the Central Highlands. Among the Tanala and the Antakarana, for example, major plot features, such as the fate of the Stone Man or the character of the Girl of Grace, can vary significantly.
