= Sodina =

Woodwind instrument used in Malagasy music

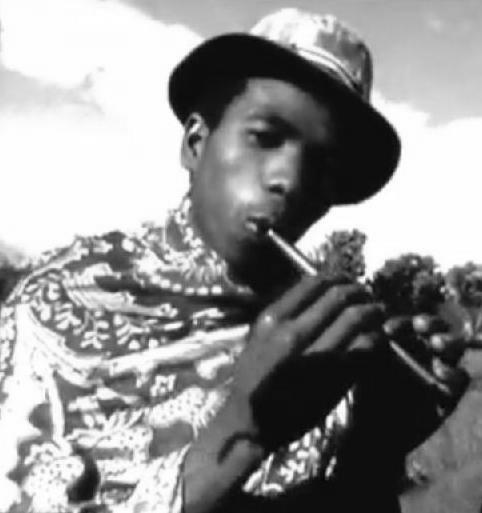
Sodina player in Madagascar

Old Malagasy Folk Song - Mandihiza Rahitsikitsika – "Dance Sparrowhawk" (Sodina)

A sodina is a woodwind instrument commonly played in Malagasy music and a member of the aerophone family of instruments. Similar in structure and sound to a flute, the sodina is usually made out of bamboo, lightwood, plastic, or reed and varies in size depending upon the region it is being played in.

Sodinas indigenous to Madagascar are often found to have anywhere from three to six equidistant openings. Sodinas can be played solo or in a group of instruments, in which case it is accompanied by many flutes and a large drum.

Ethnomusicology researches point the origins of the Sodina in Southeast Asia Islands (Indonesia, Malaysia, the Philippines) where one can still find today its bamboo form, known in Malay as suling.

Rakoto Frah is considered the greatest sodina player of the 20th century. A number of contemporary performers keep this musical tradition alive, most notably including Rakoto Frah Zanany (Rakoto Frah Junior), a group of sodina players composed of Rakoto Frah's sons; Seta Ramaroson, an established jazz saxophonist; and Nicolas Vatomanga, also a saxophonist and celebrated jazz artist.

== Discography ==
Rakoto Frah

- 1988: Flute Master of Madagascar (Globestyle)
- 1988: Souffles de Vie (Musikela)
- 1989: The Art of Rakoto Frah and Randafison Sylvestre (JVC)

Seta Ramaroson

- 2004: Introducing Vakoka: The Malagasy All Stars (World Music Network)

Rakoto Frah and Nicolas Vatomanga

- 2000: Chants et Danses en Imerina (Arion)
- 2001: Madagascar: Pays Merina (Arion)
