= Madagascar =

African island country in the Indian Ocean

Republic of Madagascar Repoblikan'i Madagasikara (Malagasy) République de Madagascar (French)
- Flag Emblem
- Motto: Fitiavana, Tanindrazana, Fandrosoana (Malagasy); Amour, Patrie, Progrès (French); "Love, Fatherland, Progress"
- Anthem: Ry Tanindrazanay malala ô ! (Malagasy); Ô Terre de nos ancêtres bien-aimés! (French) "Oh, land of our beloved ancestors!"
- Location of Madagascar (dark green)
- Capital and largest city: Antananarivo; 18°55′S 47°31′E
- Official languages: Malagasy; French
- Ethnic groups (2017): 26% Merina; 15% Betsimisaraka; 12% Betsileo; 7% Tsimihety; 6% Sakalava; 5% Antaisaka; 5% Antandroy; 24% others
- Demonym: Malagasy
- Government: Unitary semi-presidential republic under a military junta
  - President: Michael Randrianirina
  - Prime Minister: Mamitiana Rajaonarison
- Legislature: Parliament
  - Upper house: Senate (suspended)
  - Lower house: National Assembly

Formation
  - Kingdom: c. 1540
  - French protectorate: c. 1882
  - French colony: 6 August 1896
  - Republic proclaimed: 14 October 1958
  - Declaration of independence: 26 June 1960
  - Referendum: 21 December 1975
  - Socialist state: 30 December 1975 – 12 January 1992
  - Third Republic: 12 January 1992 – 11 December 2010
  - Referendum: 17 November 2010
  - Current constitution: 11 December 2010
  - 2025 Malagasy protests: 25 September – 14 October 2025
  - Coup d'état: 12–14 October 2025

Area
  - Total: 592,796 km^{2} (228,880 sq mi) (46th)
  - Water: 5,501 km^{2} (2,124 sq mi)
  - Water (%): 0.9%

Population
  - 2024 estimate: ▲31,964,956 (49th)
  - Density: 55/km^{2} (142.4/sq mi) (164th)
- GDP (PPP): 2026 estimate
  - Total: ▲$68.110 billion (117th)
  - Per capita: ▲$2,110 (182nd)
- GDP (nominal): 2026 estimate
  - Total: ▲$21.090 billion (139th)
  - Per capita: ▲$652 (188th)
- Gini (2021): ▼36.8 medium inequality
- HDI (2023): 0.487 low (183rd)
- Currency: Ariary (MGA)
- Time zone: UTC+3 (EAT)
- Date format: dd/mm/yyyy
- Calling code: +261
- ISO 3166 code: MG
- Internet TLD: .mg

Madagascar, officially the Republic of Madagascar, (Note: French: République de Madagascar; Malagasy: Repoblikan'i Madagasikara) is an island country in the Indian Ocean that includes the island of Madagascar and numerous smaller peripheral islands. Lying off the southeastern coast of Africa, it is the world's fourth-largest island, the second-largest island country, and the 46th-largest country overall. Its capital and largest city is Antananarivo.

Following the prehistoric breakup of the supercontinent Gondwana, Madagascar split from Africa during the Early Jurassic period, around 180 million years ago, and from the Indian subcontinent approximately 90 million years ago. This isolation allowed native plants and animals to evolve in relative seclusion. As a result, Madagascar is a biodiversity hotspot and one of the world's 17 megadiverse countries, with over 90% of its wildlife being endemic. The island has a subtropical to tropical maritime climate.

Madagascar was first permanently settled during or before the mid-first millennium CE (roughly 500 to 700) by Austronesian peoples, presumably arriving on outrigger canoes from present-day Indonesia. These were joined around the ninth century by Bantu groups crossing the Mozambique Channel from East Africa. Other groups continued to settle on Madagascar over time, each one making lasting contributions to Malagasy cultural life. Consequently, there are 18 or more classified peoples of Madagascar, the most numerous being the Merina of the central highlands.

Until the late 18th century, the island of Madagascar was ruled by a fragmented assortment of shifting sociopolitical alliances. Beginning in the early 19th century, most of it was united and ruled as the Kingdom of Madagascar by a series of Merina nobles. The monarchy was ended in 1897 by France's annexation of Madagascar, from which the country gained independence in 1960. It has since undergone four major constitutional periods, termed republics, and has been governed as a constitutional democracy since 1992. Following a political crisis and military coup in 2009, Madagascar underwent a protracted transition towards its fourth and current republic, with constitutional governance being restored in January 2014. In 2025, a series of mass protests resulted in a military coup and the installation of Michael Randrianirina as president of a military junta.

Madagascar is a member of the United Nations (UN), the African Union (AU), the Southern African Development Community (SADC), and the Organisation Internationale de la Francophonie. Malagasy and French are both official languages of the state. Christianity is the country's predominant religion, with a significant minority still practicing traditional faiths.

Madagascar is classified as a least-developed country by the UN. Ecotourism and agriculture, paired with greater investments in education, health, and private enterprise, are key elements of its development strategy. Despite substantial economic growth since the early 2000s, income disparities have widened, and quality of life remains low for the majority of the population. As of 2021, 68.4% of the population was considered to be multidimensionally poor.

== Etymology ==
In the Malagasy language, the island of Madagascar is called Madagasikara (Malagasy pronunciation: [madaɡasʲˈkʲarə̥]) and its people are referred to as Malagasy. The origin of the name is uncertain, and is likely foreign, having been propagated in the Middle Ages by Europeans. If this is the case, it is unknown when the name was adopted by the inhabitants of the island. No single Malagasy-language name predating Madagasikara appears to have been used by the local population to refer to it, although some communities had their name for part or all of the lands they inhabited.

One hypothesis relates Madagascar to the word Malay, referring to the Austronesian origin of the Malagasy people in modern-day Indonesia. In a map by Muhammad al-Idrisi dating from the year 1154, the island is named Gesira Malai, or "Malay island" in Arabic. The inversion of this name to Malai Gesira, as it was known by the Greeks, is thought to be the precursor of the island's modern name. The name "Malay island" was later rendered in Latin as Malichu, an abbreviated form of Malai Insula, in the medieval Hereford Mappa Mundi as the name of Madagascar.

Another hypothesis is that Madagascar is a corrupted transliteration of Mogadishu, the capital of Somalia and an important medieval Indian Ocean port. This would have resulted from the 13th-century Venetian explorer Marco Polo's confusion of the two locations in his memoirs, in which he mentions the land of Madageiscar to the south of Socotra. This name would then have been popularized on Renaissance maps by Europeans. One of the first documents written that might explain why Marco Polo called it Madagascar is in a 1609 book on Madagascar by Jerome Megizer. Megizer describes an event in which the kings of the sultanates of Mogadishu and Adal traveled to Madagascar with a fleet of around 25,000 men in order to invade the wealthy islands of Taprobane and Sumatra. However, a tempest threw them off course and they landed on the coasts of Madagascar, conquering the island and signing a treaty with its inhabitants. They remained for eight months and erected eight pillars at different points of the island on which they engraved Magadoxo, a name which later, by corruption, became Madagascar. Jan Huyghen van Linschoten, a Dutch traveler who copied Portuguese works and maps, confirmed this event by saying, "Madagascar has its name from 'makdishu' (Mogadishu)" whose "shayk" invaded it.

The name Malagasikara, or Malagascar, is also historically attested. An English state paper in 1699 records the arrival of 80 to 90 passengers from "Malagaskar" to what eventually became New York City. An 1882 edition of the British newspaper The Graphic referred to "Malagascar" as the name of the island, stating that the word was etymologically of Malay origin and might be related to the name of Malacca. In 1891, Saleh bin Osman, a Zanzibari traveler, referred to the island as "Malagaskar" when recounting his journeys, including part of the Emin Pasha Relief Expedition. In 1905, Charles Basset wrote in his doctoral thesis that Malagasikara was the way the island was referred to by its natives, who emphasized that they were Malagasy, and not Madagasy.

== History ==
=== Early period ===
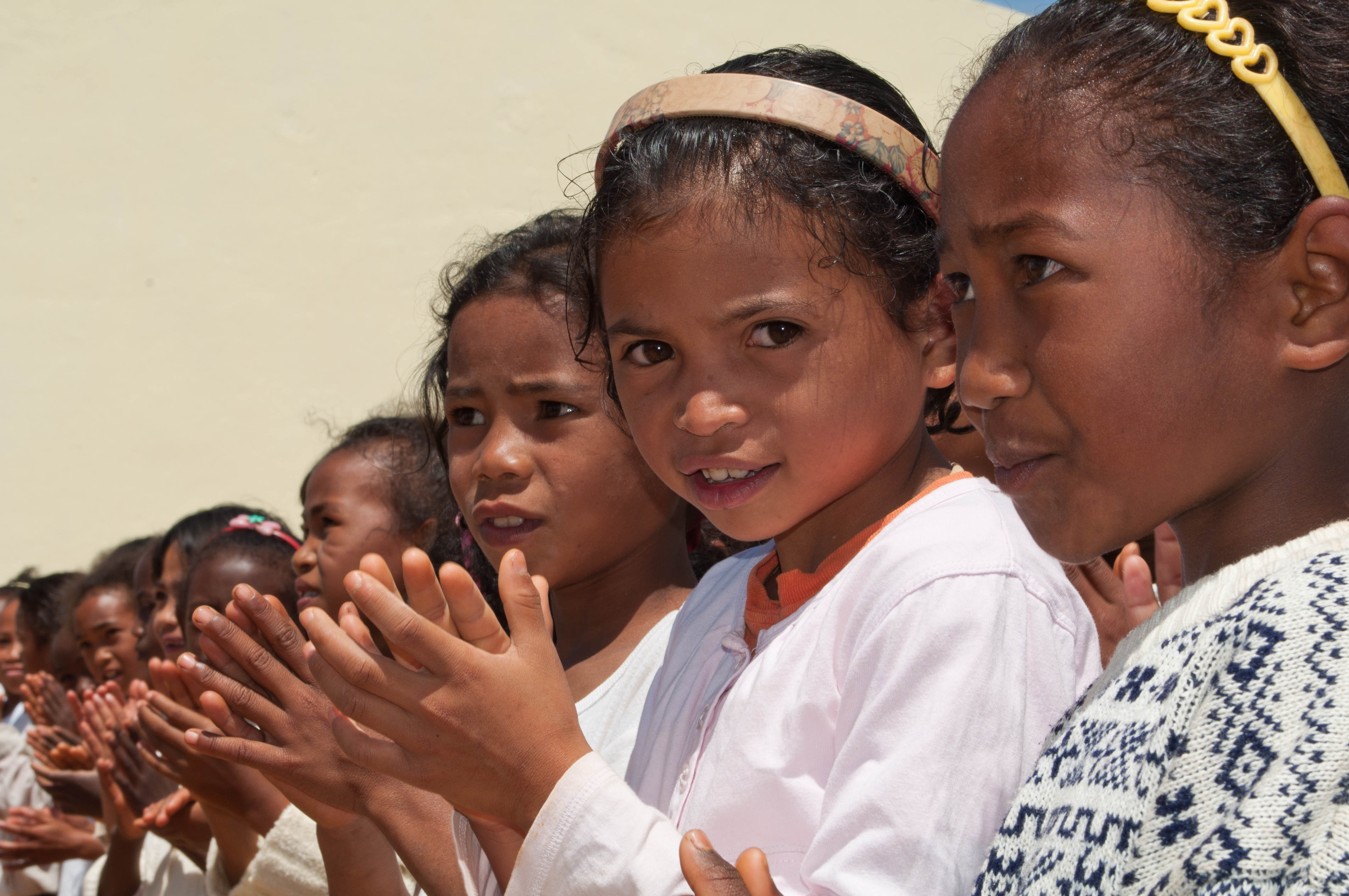
Malagasy ancestry reflects a blend of Southeast Asian, Oceanian, and Bantu (Southeast African) roots

Traditionally, archeologists have estimated that the earliest settlers arrived in successive waves in outrigger canoes from South Borneo, possibly throughout the period between 350 BCE and 550 CE, whereas others are cautious about dates earlier than 250 CE. In either case, these dates make Madagascar one of the most recent major landmasses on Earth to be settled by humans, predating the settlement of Iceland and New Zealand. It has been proposed that Ma'anyan people were brought as laborers and slaves by Javan and Sumatran-Malays in their trading fleets to Madagascar. Dates of settlement of the island earlier than the mid-first millennium CE are not strongly supported; however, there is scattered evidence for much earlier human visits and presence. (Note: Archaeological finds such as cut marks on bones found in the northwest and stone tools in the northeast indicate that Madagascar was visited by foragers around 2000 BCE. See History of Madagascar.)

Upon arrival, early settlers practiced slash-and-burn agriculture to clear the coastal rainforests for cultivation. The first settlers encountered Madagascar's abundance of megafauna, including 17 species of giant lemurs; the large flightless elephant birds (including possibly the largest bird to ever exist, Aepyornis maximus); the giant fossa; and several species of Malagasy hippopotamus, which have since become extinct because of hunting and habitat destruction. According to the General History of Africa, these first settlers, the tompontany (masters of the soil/land), are thought to have been the Kimosy in south-central Madagascar, the Antevinany in the southeast, the Antankoala and Kajemby in the northwest, and the Rasikajy in the northeast. Newer arrivals formed marriage alliances with the tompontany, facilitating their gradual assimilation.

By 600 CE, groups of these early settlers had begun clearing the forests of the Central Highlands. According to the General History of Africa, by the 8th century the Vazimba (a "way of life" rather than ethnic group) had absorbed or violently displaced the first settlers, and had come to refer to themselves as tompontany. Malagasy popular belief, however, regards the Vazimba as the island's first inhabitants.

Arab traders first reached the island between the 7th and 9th centuries, and introduced Islam and the Arabic script (adapted as sorabe for the Malagasy language). Indian Ocean trade along Madagascar's Northwestern Coast came to be controlled by the Antalaotra, Muslim Swahili-speakers who had migrated to the region around the 10th century and intermarried with the locals, forming city-states such as Mahilaka and Irodo.

A wave of Bantu-speaking migrants from southeastern Africa arrived around the year 1000. Around this time, zebu cattle from South India were first brought, intermingling with sanga cattle found in East Africa.

By 1100, all regions of Madagascar were inhabited, although the total population remained small. Societies, driven by hasina organized, after which they competed with one another over the island's estuaries and bridgeheads. Oral histories describe bloody clashes and earlier settlers were often pushed along the coast or inland. An Arab geographer wrote in 1224 that the island consisted of a great many towns and kingdoms, with kings making war on each other. Assisted by climate change, the peoples gradually transformed the island from dense forest to grassland for cultivation and zebu pastoralism.

=== Rise of early kingdoms and contact with Europeans ===
The period from 1500 to 1800 saw Madagascar's populations go from being mobile and unsettled to being organized largely into states. On the northern coast, Mahilaka was abandoned and replaced by Vohemar in the 15th century as one of the island's main trading ports, accompanied by Mazalagem Nova in the late 16th century. Portuguese navigators reached Madagascar around 1500, and sacked the port city of Sada (part of the Guingemaro kingdom) in 1506. Over the following centuries, the slave trade grew in importance as slaves were traded for firearms. In the late 17th century, Madagascar had an influx of pirates who had been expelled from the Caribbean, some of whom participated in local wars and married local women, although they were routed by the British navy in the 1720s. (Note: Solofo Randrianja writes that "one or two pirates actually claimed to rule small areas of Madagascar themselves". A 1724 book, A General History of the Pyrates (GHP), is the source of a number of narratives in popular history, one being the utopian pirate colony of Libertalia. Most modern scholars consider Libertalia to be fictional, and the Oxford Research Encyclopedia of African History describes the GHP as "not a historical primary source but [a] fabulous literary one".)

The origin of the Maroserana, the dynasty of the Sakalava Empire, is uncertain, with Sakalava traditions (Note: Called fitera, n'antoaniraza (customs), or lovan'tsofina (heritage of the ears), Sakalava oral traditions vary in content, especially when compared to Imerina's body of tradition (the Tantara ny Andriana), in part due to their time of collection in the mid-19th century when the empire had undergone disintegration, resulting in the absence of a single body of tradition.) holding that they originated from overseas and migrated to southwest Madagascar. The proto-Sakalava are thought to have originated from Sadia (located at the mouth of the Manambolo River). Historian Solofo Randrianja considers the Maroserana to have lived in south-central Madagascar, whereas Raymond Kent thought they originated in the southwest and first came to power among the Mahafaly.

Mahafaly tradition has Olembetsitoto as the first Maroserana sacred ruler in the 16th century, who was protected by an ombiasy (priest). Prior to 1600, only the north of the island was integrated into Indian Ocean trade; but in the mid-to late-16th century, European merchants (vazaha; "foreigners") began using the newly-named St. Augustine Bay in the southwest as a stopping point and traded with the communities there. The British attempted to found a colony at the Bay in 1645 but were expelled by the Malagasy.

Kent considered the Maroserana to have migrated and met the proto-Sakalava near the Mangoky River, who all traditions agree were skilled warriors. Sakalava traditions detail how a kingdom was founded along the Morondava River before 1600, called Menabe ("very red") after the red soil. In the late 16th or early 17th century, Andriamandazoala centralized the Kingdom of Menabe. (Note: Traditionally Andriamandazoala is held to have come from overseas. Other traditions say the founder was Andrianalimbe who came from the interior. Yet another strain of Sakalava tradition holds Rabaratavokoko as its founder. This name means "noble-bent-reed", while Andriamandazoala means "lord-who-withered-the-forest". Historian Raymond Kent interpreted these as implying Rabaratavokoko was a fitahina (a posthumous name deriving from a taboo around calling monarchs 'dead') for Andriamandazoala.) Andriandahifotsy expanded the state and monopolized coastal trade. (Note: Kent said that it is plausible that a long-term high birth rate among the Maroserana royal family led to many princes without administrative positions, incentivizing expansion.) After initial hostility, he established relations with European merchants.

Around 1685, a succession dispute brought Andriamanetriarivo to power in Menabe when he expelled his brother Andriamandisoarivo. Taking this opportunity to expand north with his followers, Andriamandisoarivo conquered port cities along the coast, capturing Mazalagem Nova and killing the Antalaotra sultan, establishing his commercial capital at Majunga in the early-18th century and founding the Kingdom of Boina. (Note: After the conflict they aimed to avoid disrupting the Antalaotra trade, instead only taking tribute.) How the Sakalava acquired territory in the south is disputed. Jane Hooper considers another expelled brother to have expanded south and founded Toliara in the Fiherenana Valley as an Andrevola tributary, (Note: Both Kent and Hooper wrote that the Andrevola were incorporated into the empire via a blood brotherhood ceremony called fatidra, which acted as a guarantee of safety and assistance from the monarch.) whereas Randrianja thought the Maroserana to have come to rule there during their initial migration. Kent considered a brother, Andriamandresy, to have migrated east and founded the Antesaka kingdom on the southeast coast in accordance with Antesaka tradition. Hooper writes that Andriandahifotsy re-established relations with his brothers as the Sakalava came to control Madagascar's west coast and dominate trade.

In the southwest and south, conflict between the Mahafaly and Antandroy kingdoms in the mid-17th century caused the death of two Antandroy kings and saw Mahafaly split in two: Menarandra and Sakatovo, with Menarandra soon splitting further to produce Linta. In the early 18th century, a Menarandra king expanded east to conquer the Western Antandroy, though yet another split produced Onilahy. On the East Coast, when the Antemoro settled their lands they found Muslim settlers, the Zafiraminia, already there since around 1500. A conflict between the two broke out, (Note: Represented in traditions as a battle between two giants, Darafify and Fatrapaitatana) and the Zafiraminia had come to rule the Antemoro kingdom by the mid-16th century.

In the southeast, the French founded Fort Dauphin in 1642. They intervened in local conflicts and raided for cattle, provoking insecurity. The Antanosy attacked the colony, although they were defeated by Flacourt's forces. Another attack destroyed the colony and resulted in the killing of French settlers who remained in 1674.

In the Central Highlands, Merina traditions hold that they encountered the Vazimba (Note: Represented as "primitive dwarfs") when gradually settling the highlands from the southeast, thought to have been completed by the 15th century. After peacefully coexisting for several generations, the Alasora king Andriamanelo, son of a Vazimba queen (Note: Traditions differ on whether it was Rafohy or Rangita.) and a Merina man, launched a campaign to conquer the Vazimba.

Of his successors, Ralambo founded the Merina Kingdom, (Note: In Merina tradition, Ralambo is credited with founding various institutions, such as a head tax and standing army, and with domesticating zebu.) and Andrianjaka completed the expulsion and assimilation of the Vazimba by the early 17th century. Traditions attribute the conquest of the Vazimba to the need to acquire more land for rice cultivation. Archeological research places the beginning of this expansion in the 14th century. In the mid-17th century a Mahafaly king invaded Bara territory and appointed his relatives, the Zafimanely, as rulers, who gained independence of various kinglets after his death. Betsileo kingdoms such as Arindrano and Isandra were likely founded in the mid-17th century, and the Betsileo derive their name from King Besilau, who repelled a Sakalava-Menabe invasion in the 1670s. (Note: -silau/-tsileo means "the invincible".) By the 18th century, the Betsileo were the island's most proficient cultivators of rice.

By 1720, the Sakalava-Boina king Toakafo is considered to have been the most powerful ruler in Madagascar, and possibly ruled the entire northern third of the island. In the 18th century, the French established various trading posts along the east coast in order to supply the Mascarenes. On the northeast coast, the Tsikoa tribe coalesced under a single ruler and invaded the Antavaratra (Northerners) c. 1710, intent on capturing their lucrative ports. Ratsimilaho, a son of an English pirate and a Malagasy woman who had been Toakafo's chief minister, managed to unite the Antavaratra, repel the Tsikoa, and drive them south. Ratsimilaho founded the Betsimisaraka Confederation, and by the 1730s was one of the most powerful kings in Madagascar, although the state disintegrated soon after his death in 1754.

The French attempted to set up trading posts on the northwest coast, resulting in conflict with the Sakalava in the 1770s that ended inconclusively. The Merina king Andriamasinavalona expanded the kingdom further and ruled much of the Central Highlands during his reign, though in the early 18th century he abdicated and divided the state between four of his sons. A fierce civil war ensued characterized by slave-raiding and -trading, and it was not until the 1790s that the kingdom was reunited by means of conquest and diplomacy by Andrianampoinimerina.

=== 19th century and the Kingdom of Madagascar ===
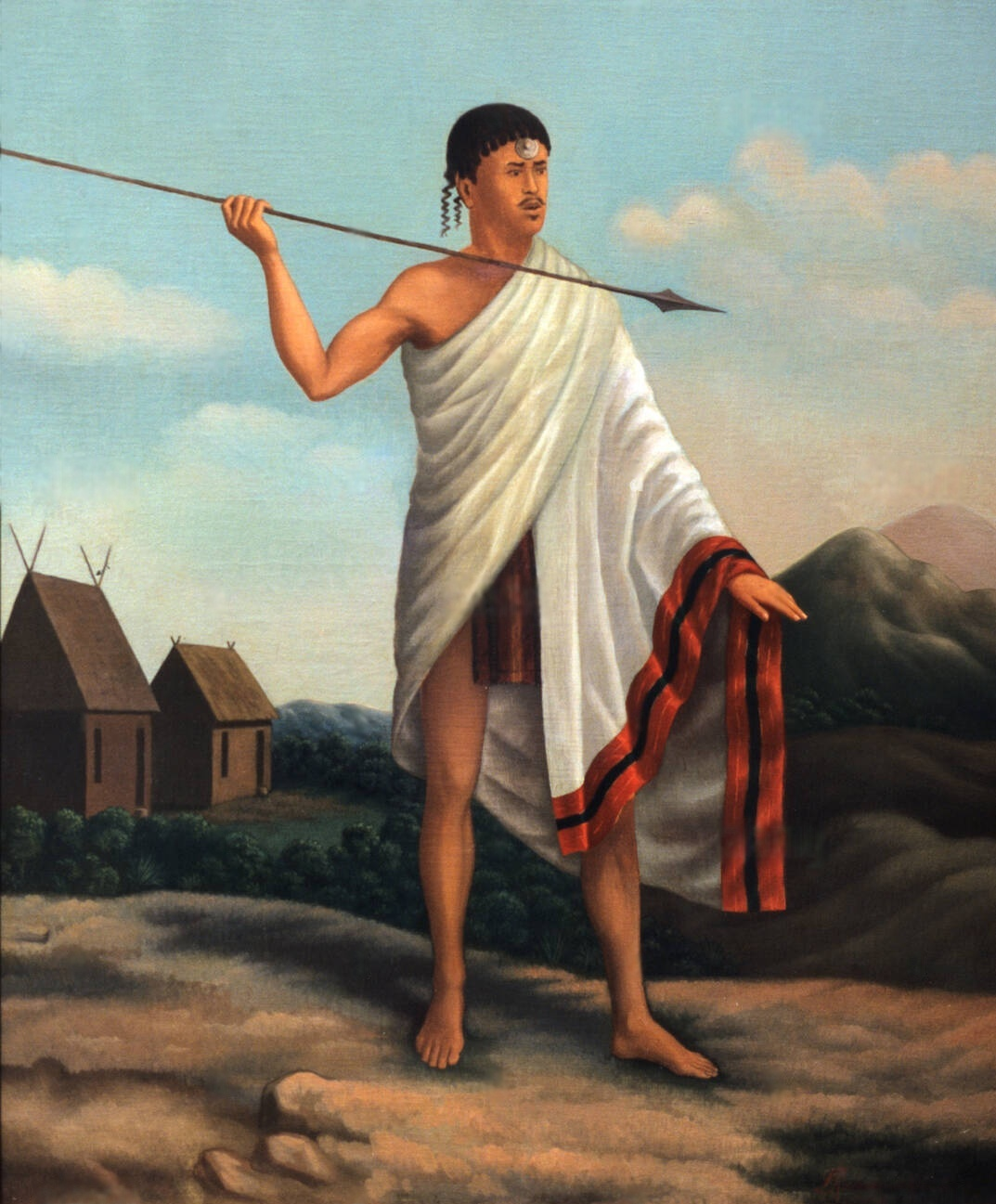
King Andrianampoinimerina (1787–1810)

After reuniting Imerina and seated at the Rova of Antananarivo, Andrianampoinimerina rapidly expanded his rule over neighboring principalities. He used the ports' reliance on the supply of slaves from the highlands to gain control over trade on the Eastern Coast.

His ambition to bring the entire island under his control was largely achieved by his son and successor, King Radama I (r. 1810–28). The 18th century had seen rivalry between the French and the British over the wider Indian Ocean trade, of which Malagasy trade had proved decisive during the Carnatic Wars. Radama expanded east to control Toamasina on the coast, and concluded a treaty in 1817 with the British governor of Mauritius to abolish the lucrative slave trade in return for British military and financial assistance, and recognition as the "King of Madagascar". Artisan missionary envoys from the London Missionary Society began arriving in 1818. They established schools, transcribed the Malagasy language using the Roman alphabet, and translated the Bible. In response, the Sakalava and French found themselves as natural allies. Radama embarked on successive campaigns to conquer the island, subduing the east coast, dismantling Iboina and expelling its ruler, and achieving Menabe's nominal submission. By 1828 he controlled two-thirds of the island (excepting the Bara, Mahafaly, and Antandroy), although Merina rule was far from secure and widespread resistance continued.

Radama's successor, Queen Ranavalona I (r. 1828–61), responded to increasing political and cultural encroachment on the part of Britain and France by issuing a royal edict prohibiting the practice of Christianity in Madagascar and pressuring most foreigners to leave the territory. The queen made heavy use of the traditional practice of fanompoana (forced labor as tax payment) to complete public works projects and develop a standing army of between 20,000 and 30,000 Merina soldiers, whom she deployed to pacify outlying regions of the island and further expand the Merina Kingdom to encompass most of Madagascar.

Residents of Madagascar could accuse one another of various crimes, including theft, Christianity, and especially witchcraft, for which the ordeal of tangena (a poison trial) was routinely obligatory. Between 1828 and 1861, the tangena ordeal caused about 3,000 deaths annually. The combination of regular warfare, disease, difficult forced labor, and harsh measures of justice resulted in a high mortality rate among soldiers and civilians alike during the queen's 33-year reign. The population of Madagascar is estimated to have declined from around 5 million to 2.5 million between 1833 and 1839.

In 1839, Boina queen Tsiomeko, having fled to the island of Nosy Be, requested French assistance against Merina attacks. In accordance with France's conditions, she signed over Nosy Be and part of the mainland to the French, which they then declared as France's protectorate.

Among those who continued to reside in Imerina were Jean Laborde, an entrepreneur who developed munitions and other industries on behalf of the monarchy, and Joseph-François Lambert, a French adventurer and slave trader, with whom then-Prince Radama II signed a controversial trade agreement termed the Lambert Charter. Succeeding his mother, Radama II attempted to relax the queen's stringent policies but was overthrown two years later by Prime Minister Rainivoninahitriniony and an alliance of Andriana (noble) and Hova (commoner) courtiers, who sought to end the monarch's absolute power.

Following the coup, the courtiers offered Radama's queen, Rasoherina, the opportunity to rule, if she would accept a power-sharing arrangement with the prime minister: a new social contract that would be sealed by a political marriage between them. Queen Rasoherina accepted, first marrying Rainivoninahitriniony, then later deposing him and marrying his brother, Prime Minister Rainilaiarivony, who would go on to marry Queen Ranavalona II and Queen Ranavalona III in succession.

Over the course of Rainilaiarivony's 31-year tenure as prime minister, numerous policies were adopted to modernize and consolidate the central government's power. Schools were constructed throughout the island and attendance was made mandatory. Army organization was improved and British consultants were employed to train and professionalize soldiers. Polygamy was outlawed and Christianity, declared the official religion of the court in 1869, was adopted alongside traditional beliefs among a growing portion of the populace. Legal codes were reformed on the basis of British common law and three European-style courts were established in the capital city. In his joint role as commander-in-chief, Rainilaiarivony also successfully ensured the defense of Madagascar against several French colonial incursions. The French devised plans in 1842 and the 1860s to land troops in Madagascar and assist the Sakalava, who continued to resist, in a war against Imerina; however, they did not materialize.

=== French colonization and the colonial period ===
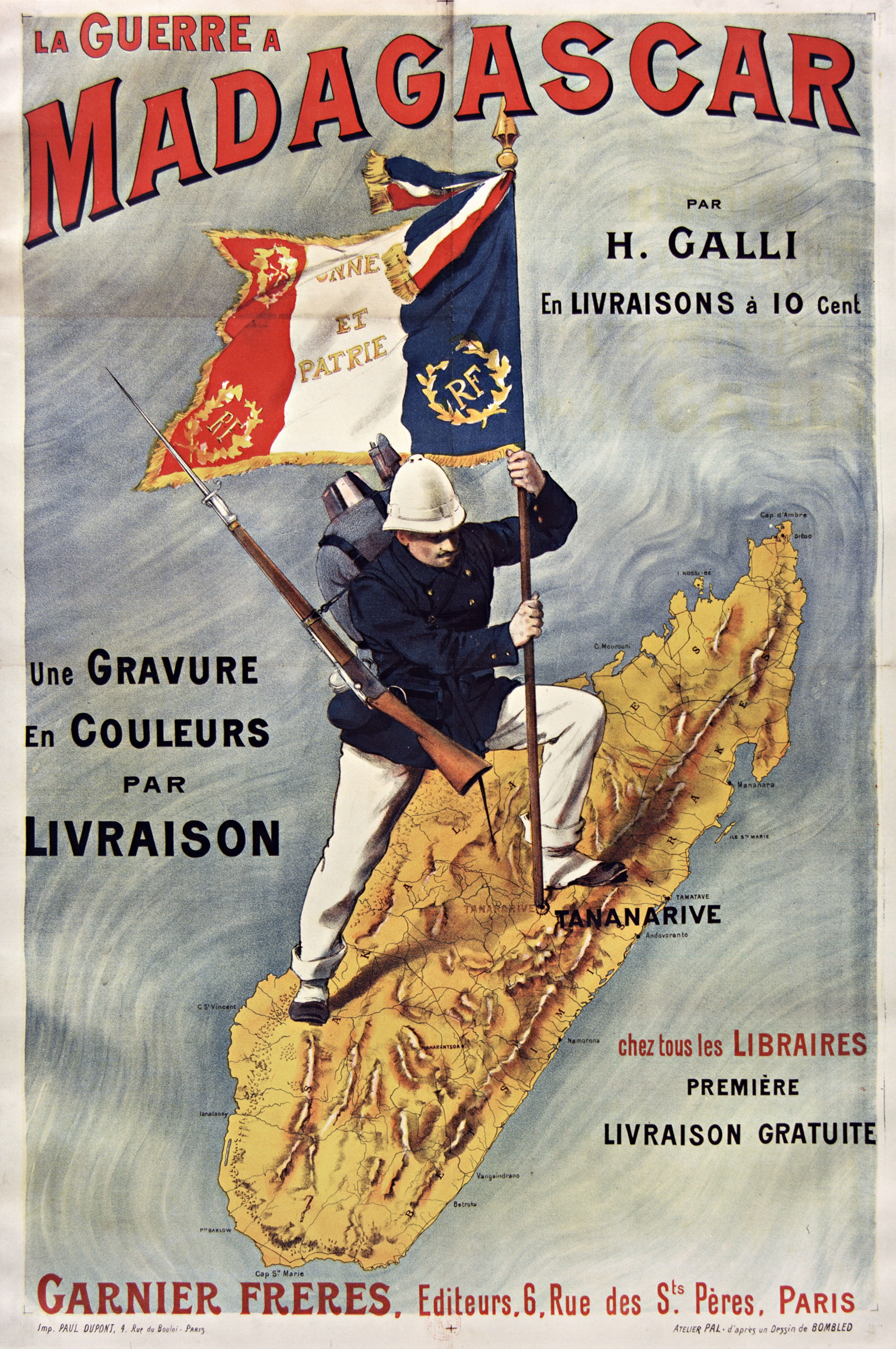
French poster about the Franco-Hova War

In 1883 after diplomatic fallout, France began the First Franco-Hova War by bombing Majunga, during which Madagascar suffered under blockade and diplomatic isolation as it was ignored by the nominally allied British. In 1885, an ambiguous peace treaty was signed that allowed the two parties to interpret it to their benefit: Madagascar viewed it as affirming its sovereignty, France viewed it as establishing protectorate status. Although the British accepted the full formal imposition of a French protectorate on the island in 1890, French authority was not acknowledged by the government of Madagascar. To force capitulation, the French bombarded and occupied the harbor of Toamasina on the east coast and Majunga on the west coast in December 1894 and January 1895, respectively.

A French military flying column then marched toward Antananarivo, losing many men to malaria and other diseases. Reinforcements came from Algeria and Sub-Saharan Africa. Upon reaching the city in September 1895, the column bombarded the royal palace with heavy artillery, causing heavy casualties and leading Queen Ranavalona III to surrender. Popular resistance to the French capture of Antananarivo—known as the Menalamba rebellion—broke out in December 1895 and was not suppressed until the end of 1897. France annexed Madagascar in 1896 and declared the island a colony the following year, dissolving the Merina monarchy and sending the royal family into exile to the island country of Réunion and Algeria.

The conquest was followed by 10 years of civil war, due to the Menalamba insurrection. The "pacification" carried out by the French administration lasted more than 15 years, in response to the rural guerrillas scattered throughout the country. The French campaign against Menabe began with the Ambiky massacre in 1897, ending in 1902. The Antandroy and Mahafaly continued to oppose colonial rule, though yielded in 1904. In total, the repression of this resistance to colonial conquest caused several tens of thousands of Malagasy victims.

Under colonial rule, plantations were established for the production of a variety of export crops. Slavery was abolished in 1896, freeing approximately 500,000 slaves, though many remained in their former masters' homes as servants or as sharecroppers. In many parts of the island strong discriminatory views against slave descendants are still held today. Wide paved boulevards and gathering places were constructed in the capital city of Antananarivo and the Rova palace compound was turned into a museum. Additional schools were built, particularly in rural and coastal areas where the schools of the Merina had not reached. Education became mandatory between the ages of 6 and 13, focusing primarily on the French language and practical skills.

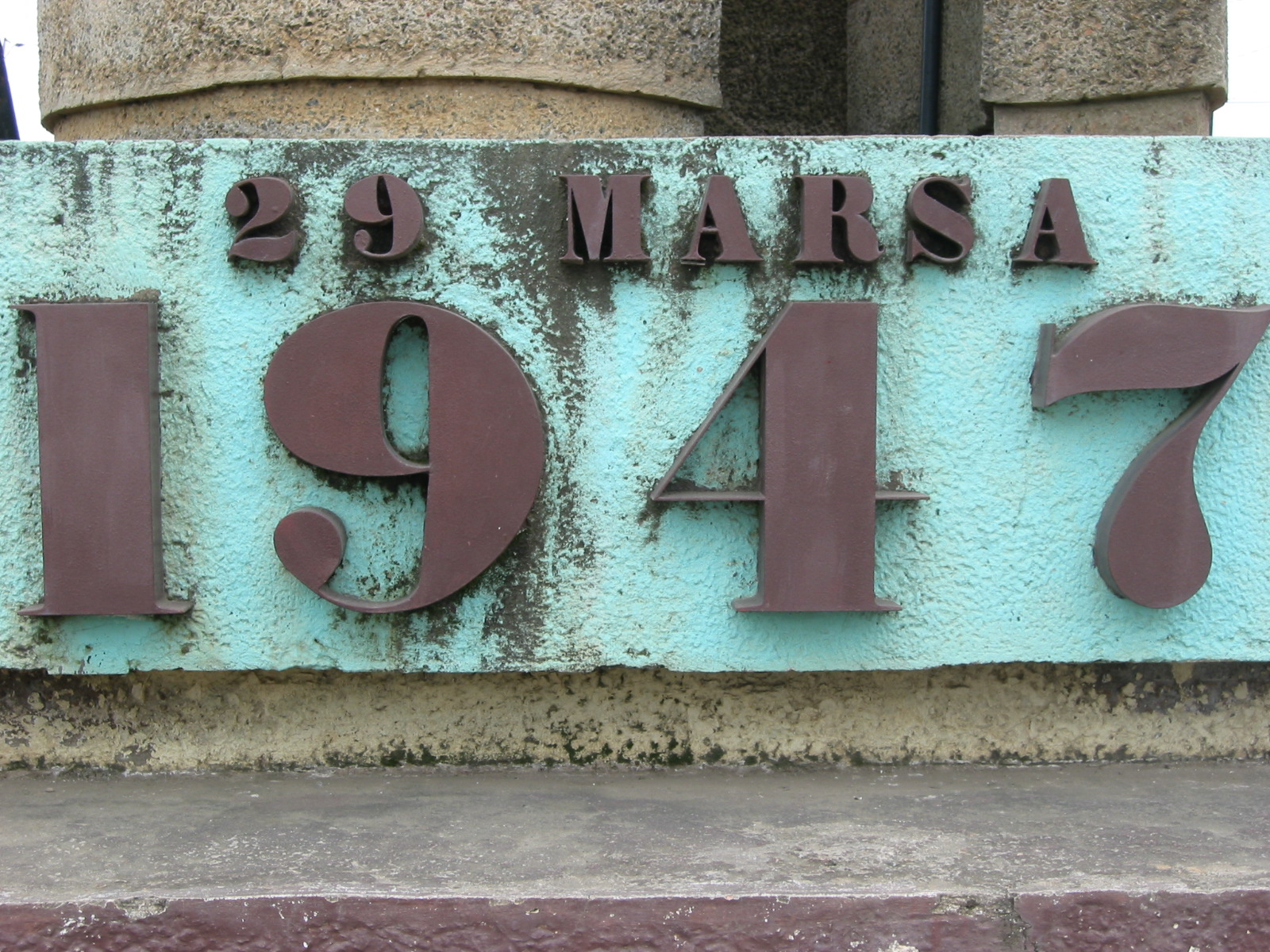
National monument in Moramanga commemorating the beginning of the Malagasy Uprising on 29 March 1947. Between 11,000 and 90,000 Malagasy died during the uprising, which lasted nearly two years.

Huge mining and forestry concessions were granted to large companies. Native chiefs loyal to the French administration were also granted part of the land. Forced labor was introduced in favor of the French companies and peasants were encouraged, through taxation, to work for wages (especially in the colonial concessions), to the detriment of small individual farms. However, the colonial period was accompanied by movements fighting for independence: the Menalamba, the Vy Vato Sakelika, and the Democratic Movement for Malagasy Renovation (MDRM). In 1927, major demonstrations were organized in Antananarivo, notably on the initiative of the communist activist François Vittori, who was imprisoned as a result. The 1930s saw the Malagasy anti-colonial movement gain further momentum. Malagasy trade unionism began to appear underground and the Communist Party of the Madagascar region was formed. But in 1939, all these organizations were dissolved by the administration of the colony, which opted for the Vichy regime. The MDRM was accused by the colonial regime of being at the root of the 1947 insurrection and was pursued by violent repression.

The Merina royal tradition of taxes paid in the form of labor was continued under the French and used to construct a railway and roads linking key coastal cities to Antananarivo.

Malagasy troops fought for France in World War I. In the 1930s, Nazi political thinkers developed the Madagascar Plan that had identified the island as a potential site for the deportation of Europe's Jews. During World War II, the island was the site of the Battle of Madagascar between the Vichy French and an Allied expeditionary force. The occupation of France during the Second World War tarnished the prestige of the colonial administration in Madagascar and galvanized the growing independence movement, leading to the Malagasy Uprising of 1947. This movement led the French to establish reformed institutions in 1956 under the Loi Cadre (Overseas Reform Act), and Madagascar moved peacefully towards independence. The Malagasy Republic was proclaimed on 14 October 1958, as an autonomous state within the French Community. A period of provisional government ended with the adoption of a constitution in 1959 and full independence on 26 June 1960.

=== Independent state ===
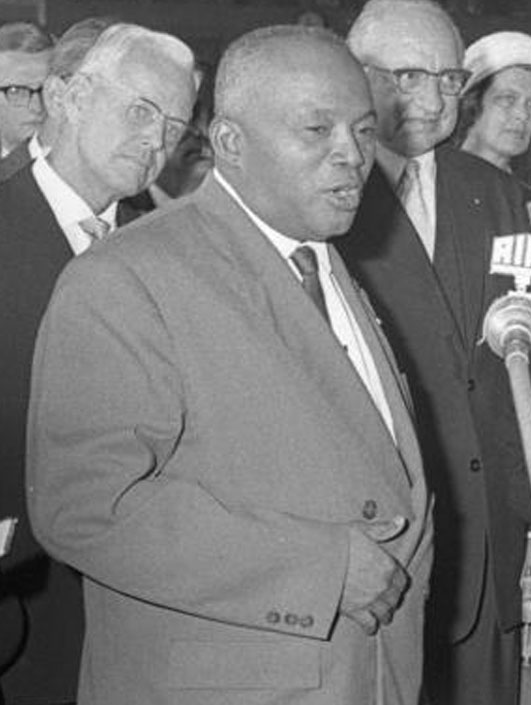
Philibert Tsiranana, first president of Madagascar (1960–1972)

Since regaining independence, Madagascar has transitioned through four republics with corresponding revisions to its constitution. The First Republic (1960–72), under the leadership of French-appointed President Philibert Tsiranana, was characterized by a continuation of strong economic and political ties to France. Many high-level technical positions were filled by French expatriates; and French teachers, textbooks, and curricula continued to be used in schools around the country. Popular resentment over Tsiranana's tolerance for this "neo-colonial" arrangement inspired a series of farmer and student protests that overturned his administration in 1972.

Gabriel Ramanantsoa, a major general in the army, was appointed interim president and prime minister that same year but low public approval forced him to step down in 1975. Colonel Richard Ratsimandrava, appointed to succeed him, was assassinated six days into his tenure. General Gilles Andriamahazo ruled after Ratsimandrava for four months before being replaced by another military appointee, Vice Admiral Didier Ratsiraka, who ushered in the Marxist–Leninist Second Republic that ran under his tenure from 1975 to 1993.

This period saw a political alignment with the Eastern Bloc countries and a shift toward economic insularity. These policies, coupled with economic pressures stemming from the 1973 oil crisis, resulted in the rapid collapse of Madagascar's economy and a sharp decline in living standards, and by 1979 the country had become completely bankrupt. The Ratsiraka administration accepted the conditions of transparency, anti-corruption measures, and free market policies imposed by the International Monetary Fund, World Bank, and various bilateral donors in exchange for their bailout of the nation's broken economy.

Ratsiraka's dwindling popularity in the late 1980s reached a critical point in 1991 when presidential guards opened fire on unarmed protesters during a rally. Within two months, a transitional government had been established under the leadership of Albert Zafy (1993–96), who went on to win the 1992 presidential elections and inaugurate the Third Republic (1992–2010). The new Madagascar Constitution established a multi-party democracy and a separation of powers placing significant control in the hands of the National Assembly. The constitution also emphasized human rights, social and political freedoms, and free trade. Zafy's term, however, was marred by economic decline, allegations of corruption, and his introduction of legislation to give himself greater powers. Consequently, he was impeached in 1996 and an interim president, Norbert Ratsirahonana, was appointed for the three months prior to the next presidential election. Ratsiraka was then voted back into power on a platform of decentralization and economic reforms for a second term lasting from 1996 to 2001.

The contested 2001 presidential elections in which the then-mayor of Antananarivo, Marc Ravalomanana, eventually emerged victorious, caused a seven-month standoff in 2002 between supporters of Ravalomanana and Ratsiraka. The negative economic impact of the political crisis was gradually overcome by Ravalomanana's progressive economic and political policies encouraging investments in education and ecotourism, facilitated foreign direct investment, and cultivated trading partnerships both regionally and internationally. The national GDP grew at an average rate of 7% per year under his administration. In the latter half of his second term, however, Ravalomanana was criticized by domestic and international observers who accused him of increasing authoritarianism and corruption.

Opposition leader and then-mayor of Antananarivo, Andry Rajoelina, led a movement in early 2009 in which Ravalomanana was pushed from power in an unconstitutional process widely condemned as a coup d'état. In March 2009, Rajoelina was declared by the Supreme Court as president of the High Transitional Authority, an interim governing body responsible for moving the country toward presidential elections. In 2010, a new constitution was adopted by referendum, establishing a Fourth Republic, which sustained the democratic, multi-party structure established in the previous constitution. Hery Rajaonarimampianina was declared the winner of the 2013 presidential election, which the international community deemed fair and transparent.

In 2018 the first round of Malagasy's presidential election was held on 7 November and the second on 10 December. Three former presidents and the most recent president were the main candidates. Rajoelina won the second round of the elections. Although Ravalomana lost that round, he did not accept the results because of allegations of fraud. Rajaonarimampianina received very modest support in the first round. In January 2019, the High Constitutional Court declared Rajoelina as the winner of the elections and the new president. In the June 2019 parliamentary elections, Rajoelina won an absolute majority of the seats of the National Assembly. It received 84 seats and the supporters of former president Ravalomana got only 16 seats of 151 seats of the National Assembly. Fifty-one seats of deputies were independent or represented small parties. Rajoelina could rule as a strongman.

Mid-2021 marked the beginning of the 2021–2022 Madagascar famine, which, due to a severe drought, caused hundreds of thousands of people to face food insecurity and leaving over one million on the verge of famine.

In November 2023, Rajoelina was re-elected to another term with 58.95% of the vote in the first round of the election amid an opposition boycott and a controversy about his acquisition of French citizenship and subsequent eligibility. The turnout was 46.36%, the lowest in a presidential election in the country's history. Power and water cuts, as well as general distrust of Rajoelina's administration, sparked a series of protests in 2025 culminating in his flight and impeachment with the military taking control of the country. On 17 October 2025, Colonel Michael Randrianirina was sworn in as Madagascar's new president to succeed Rajoelina.

== Geography ==
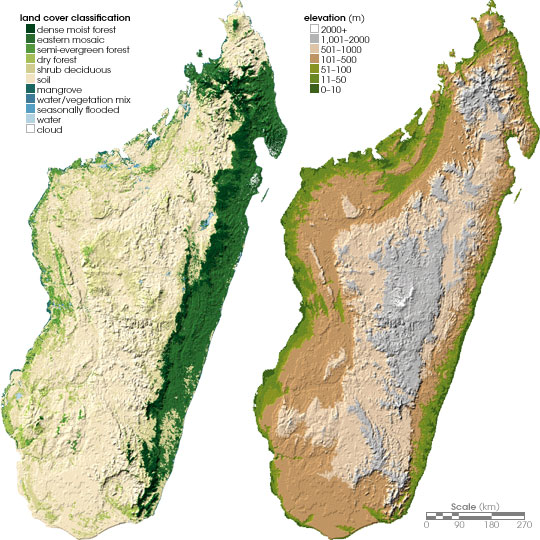
Land coverage (left) and topographical (right) maps of Madagascar

With 592,800 square kilometres (228,900 sq mi), Madagascar is the world's 46th-largest country, the second-largest island country and the fourth-largest island. The country lies mostly between latitudes 12°S and 26°S and longitudes 43°E and 51°E. Neighboring islands include the French territory of Réunion and the country of Mauritius to the east, as well as the state of Comoros and the French territory of Mayotte to the northwest. The nearest mainland state is Mozambique, located to the west.

The prehistoric breakup of the supercontinent Gondwana resulted in the separation of East Gondwana (comprising Madagascar, Antarctica, Australia and the Indian subcontinent) and West Gondwana (Africa and South America) during the Jurassic period, around 185 million years ago. The Indo-Madagascar landmass separated from Antarctica and Australia around 125 million years ago, and Madagascar from the Indian landmass about 84 to 92 million years ago during the Late Cretaceous Period. This long history of separation from other continents has allowed plants and animals on the island to evolve in relative isolation.

Along the length of Madagascar's Eastern Coast runs a narrow and steep escarpment containing much of the island's remaining tropical lowland forest. To the west of this ridge lies a plateau in the center of the island ranging in altitude from 750 to 1,500 m (2,460 to 4,920 ft) above sea level. These Central Highlands, traditionally the homeland of the Merina people and the location of their historic capital at Antananarivo, are the most densely populated part of the island, characterized by terraced, rice-growing valleys lying between grassy hills and patches of the subhumid forests that formerly covered the highland region. To the west of the highlands, the increasingly arid terrain gradually slopes down to the Mozambique Channel and mangrove swamps along the coast.

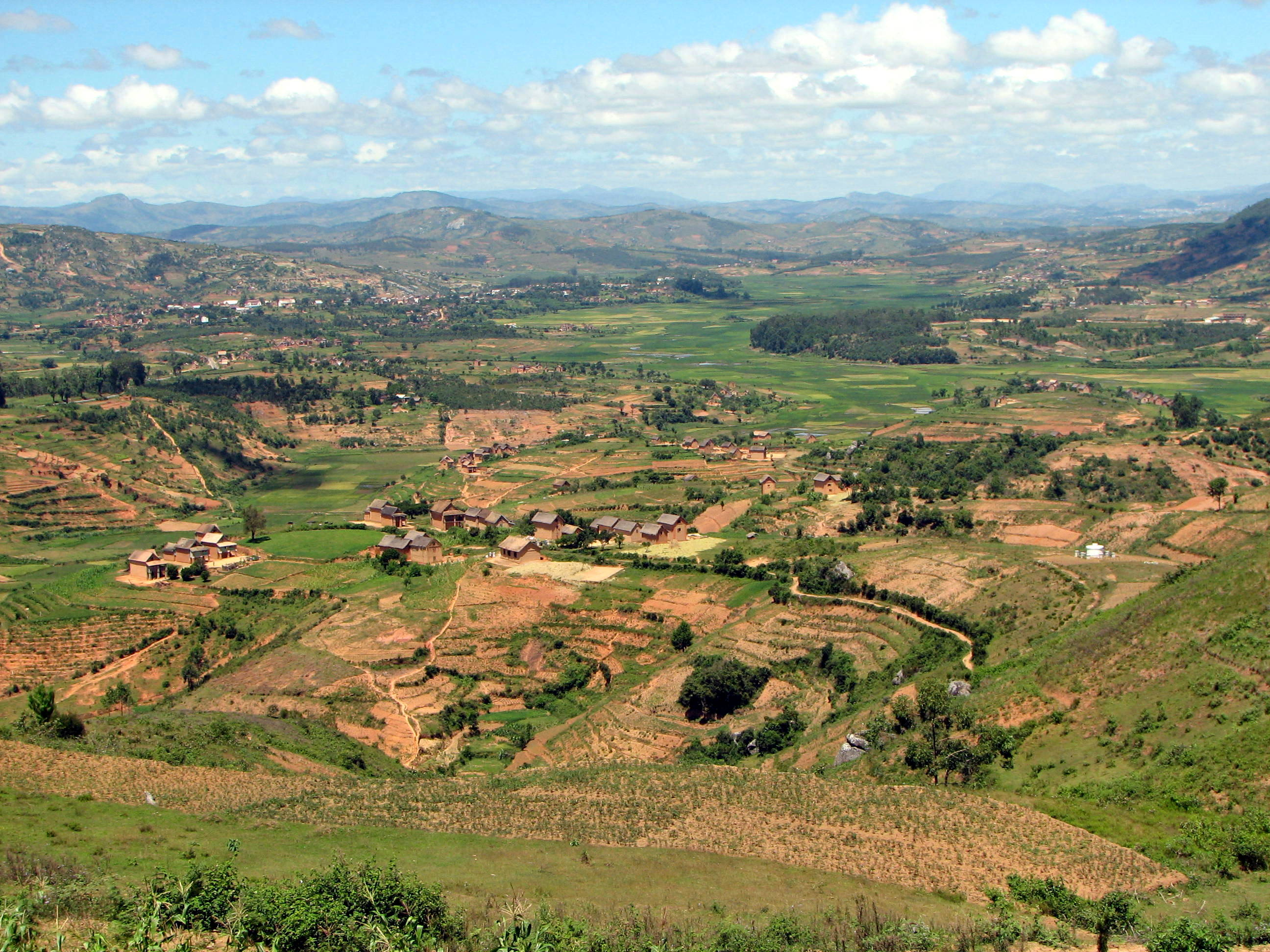
Landscape in the Central Highlands region

Madagascar's highest peaks rise from three prominent highland massifs. Maromokotro 2,876 m (9,436 ft) in the Tsaratanana Massif is the island's highest point, followed by Boby Peak 2,658 m (8,720 ft) in the Andringitra Massif, and Tsiafajavona 2,643 m (8,671 ft) in the Ankaratra Massif. To the east, the Canal des Pangalanes is a chain of human-made and natural lakes connected by canals built by the French just inland from the east coast and running parallel to it for some 600 km (370 mi).

The western and southern sides, which lie in the rain shadow of the Central Highlands, are home to dry deciduous forests, spiny forests, and deserts and xeric shrublands. Due to their lower population densities, Madagascar's dry deciduous forests have been better preserved than the Eastern Rainforests or the original woodlands of the Central Plateau. The Western Coast features many protected harbors, but silting is a major problem caused by sediment from the high levels of inland erosion carried by rivers crossing the broad Western Plains.

=== Climate ===
Köppen climate classification map of Madagascar

The combination of southeastern trade winds and northwestern monsoons produces a hot rainy season (November–April) with frequently destructive cyclones, and a relatively cooler dry season (May–October). Rain clouds originating over the Indian Ocean discharge much of their moisture over the island's Eastern Coast and the heavy precipitation supports the area's rainforest ecosystem. The Central Highlands are both drier and cooler. The west is drier still, and a semi-arid climate prevails in the island's southwest and southern interior.

Tropical cyclones cause damage to infrastructure and local economies as well as loss of life. In March 2004, Cyclone Gafilo became the strongest cyclone ever recorded to hit the country. The storm killed 363 people, left 214,260 homeless, and caused more than US$250 million in damage. In February 2022, Cyclone Batsirai killed 121 people, weeks after Cyclone Ana killed 55 and displaced 130,000.

A 2022 analysis found that in order to adapt to and avert the environmental consequences of climate change, Madagascar would have to spend 15% of its GDP.

=== Biodiversity and conservation ===
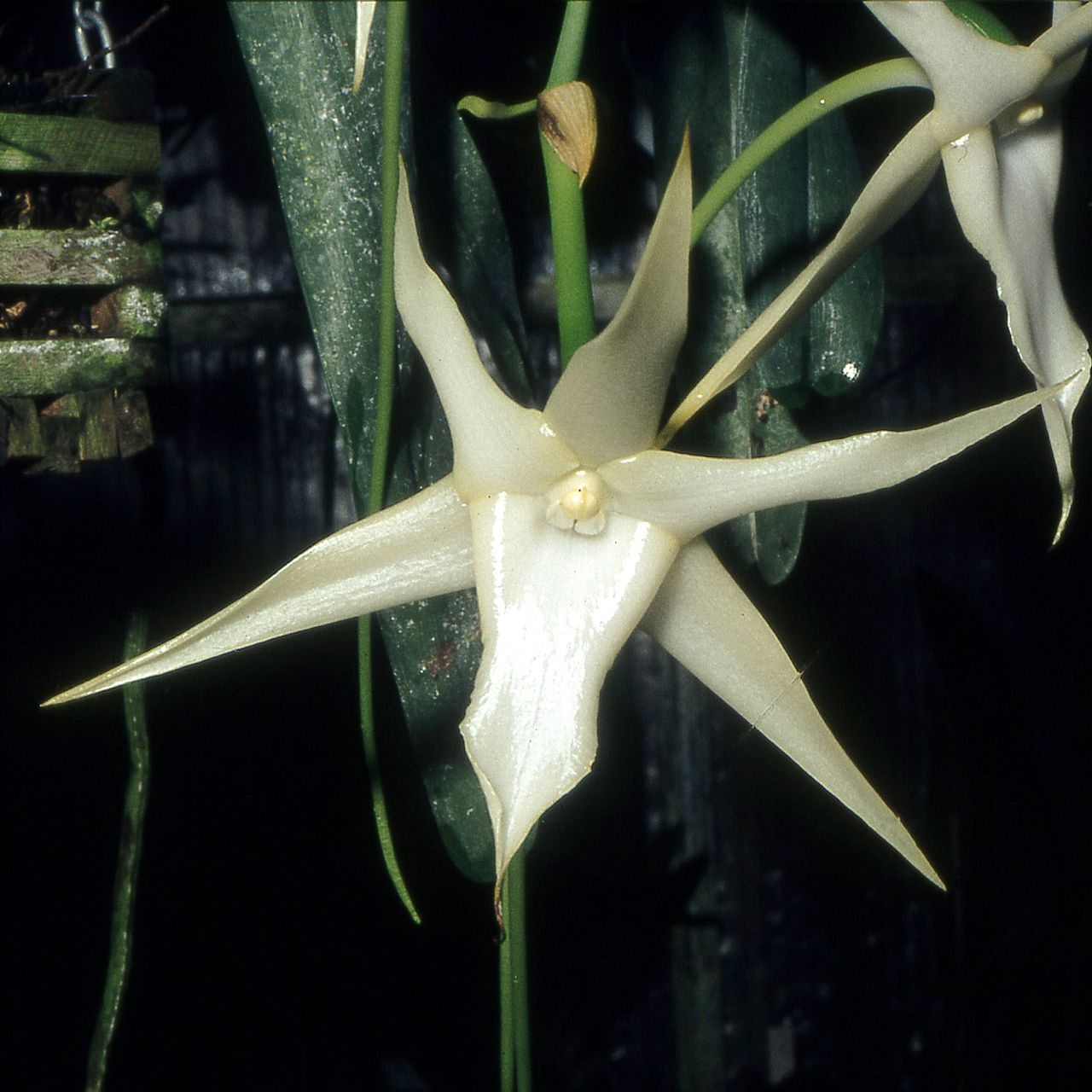
Comet orchid (Angraecum sesquipedale). The flowers of this orchid have a very long spur and are pollinated by a species of hawkmoth with a proboscis of matching length.

As a result of the island's long isolation from neighboring continents, Madagascar is home to various endemic plants and animals found nowhere else on Earth. Approximately 90% of all plant and animal species found in Madagascar are endemic. This distinctive ecology has led some ecologists to refer to Madagascar as the "eighth continent", and the island has been classified by Conservation International as a biodiversity hotspot. It is classed as one of 17 megadiverse countries. The country is home to seven terrestrial ecoregions: lowland forests, subhumid forests, dry deciduous forests, ericoid thickets, spiny forests, succulent woodlands, and mangroves.

More than 80% of Madagascar's 14,883 plant species are found nowhere else in the world, including five plant families. The family Didiereaceae, composed of four genera and 11 species, is limited to the spiny forests of southwestern Madagascar. Four-fifths of the world's Pachypodium species are endemic to the island. Three-fourths of Madagascar's 860 orchid species are found there alone, as are six of the world's nine baobab species. The island is home to around 170 palm species, three times as many as on all of mainland Africa, of which 165 are endemic.

Many native plant species are used as herbal remedies for a variety of afflictions. For instance, the drugs vinblastine and vincristine are vinca alkaloids—which are used to treat Hodgkin lymphoma, leukemia, and other cancers— were derived from the Madagascar periwinkle. The traveler's palm, known locally as Ravenala and endemic to the Eastern Rainforests, is highly iconic of Madagascar and featured in the national emblem as well as the Madagascar Airlines logo.

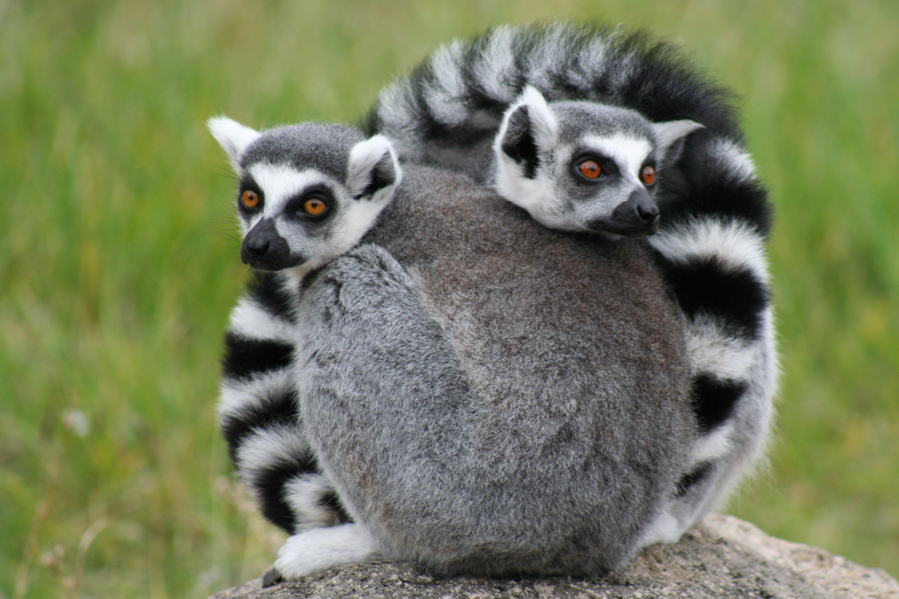
The ring-tailed lemur is one of over 100 known species and subspecies of lemur found only in Madagascar.

Like its flora, Madagascar's fauna are diverse and exhibit a high rate of endemism. Lemurs have been characterized as "Madagascar's flagship mammal species" by Conservation International. In the absence of monkeys and other competitors, these primates have adapted to a wide range of habitats and diversified into numerous species. As of 2012, there were officially 103 species and subspecies of the lemur, 39 of which were described by zoologists between 2000 and 2008. Almost all of these are classified as rare, vulnerable, or endangered. Since the arrival of humans on Madagascar, at least 17 species of lemur have become extinct, all of which were larger than the surviving lemur species.

A number of other mammals, including the catlike fossa, are endemic to Madagascar. Over 300 species of birds have been recorded on the island, of which over 60%—including four families and 42 genera—are endemic. The few families and genera of reptiles that have reached Madagascar have diversified into more than 260 species, with over 90% of these being endemic, including one endemic family. The island is home to two-thirds of the world's chameleon species, including the smallest known.

Endemic fish of Madagascar include two families, 15 genera, and over 100 species, primarily inhabiting the island's freshwater lakes and rivers. Although invertebrates remain poorly studied in Madagascar, researchers have found high rates of endemism among the known species. All 651 species of terrestrial snail are endemic, for example, as are a majority of the island's butterflies, scarab beetles, lacewings, spiders, and dragonflies.

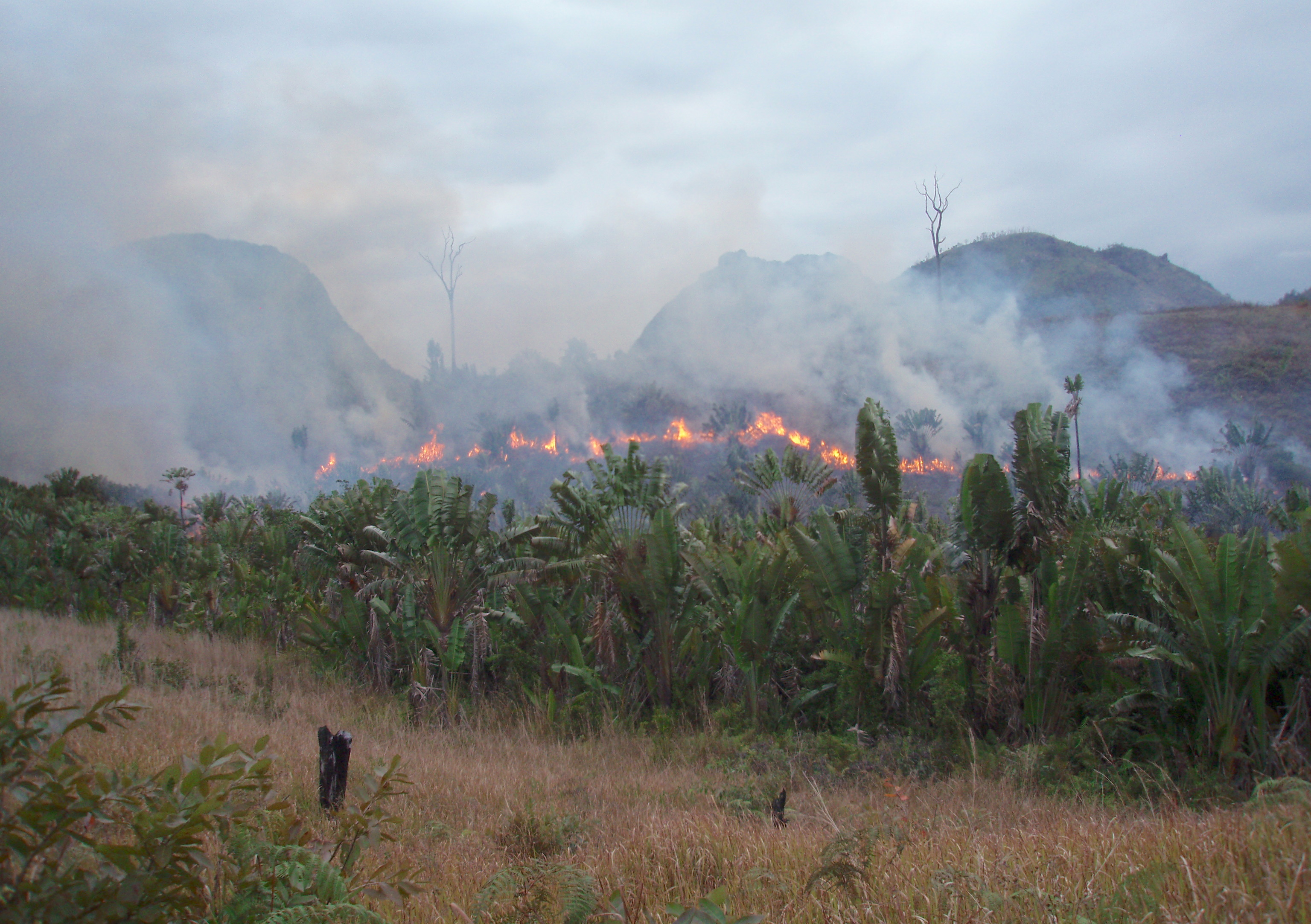
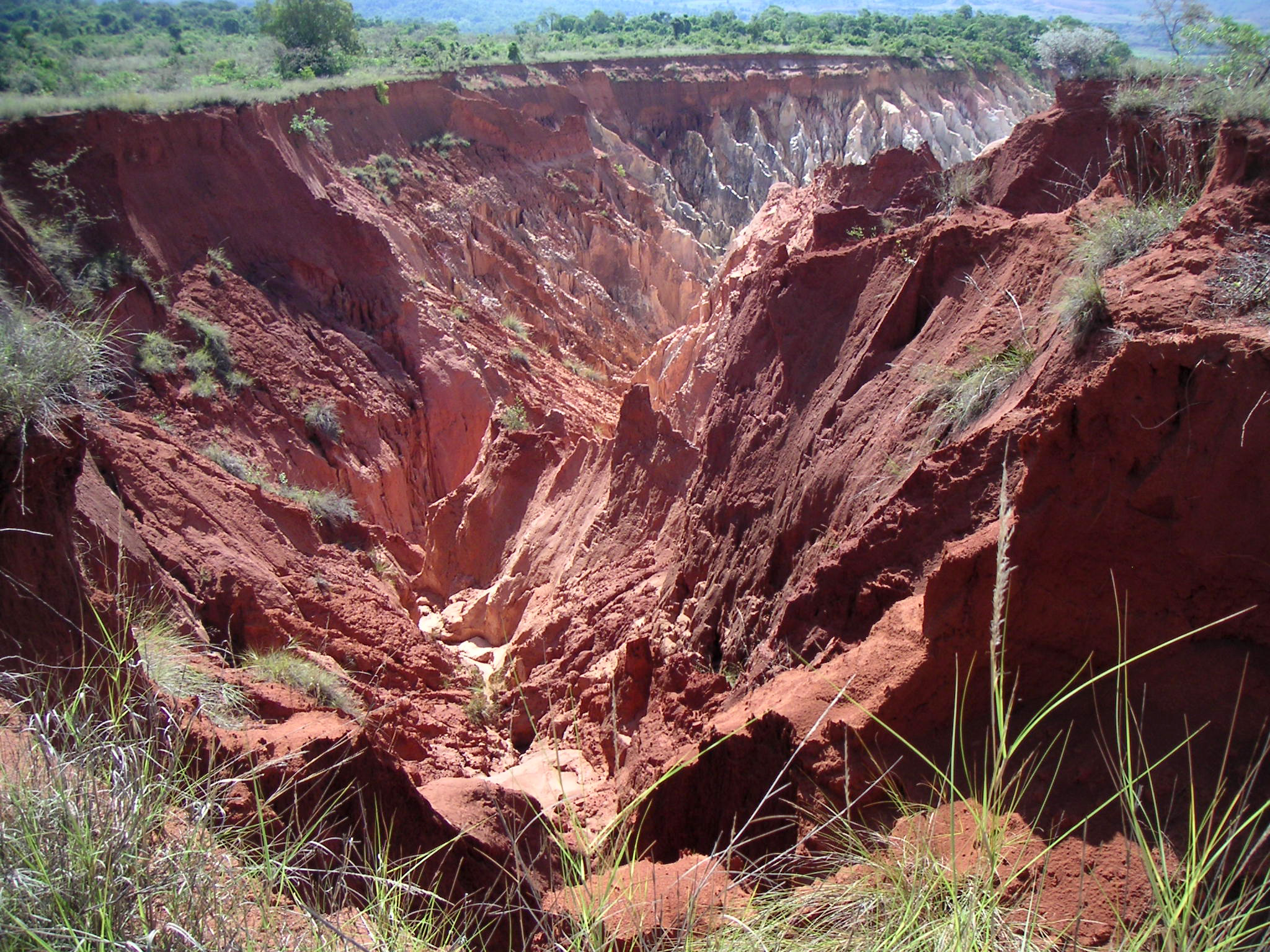
Tavy (slash-and-burn) destruction of native forest habitat is widespread (top), causing massive erosion (bottom).

Madagascar's varied fauna and flora are endangered by human activity. Since the arrival of humans around 2,350 years ago, Madagascar has lost more than 90% of its original forest. This forest loss is largely fueled by tavy (fat), a traditional slash-and-burn agricultural practice imported to Madagascar by the earliest settlers. Malagasy farmers embrace and perpetuate the practice not only for its practical benefits as an agricultural technique but also for its cultural associations with prosperity, health, and venerated ancestral custom (fomba malagasy). As human population density rose on the island, deforestation accelerated beginning around 1,400 years ago. By the 16th century, the Central Highlands had been largely cleared of their original forests. More recent contributors to the loss of forest cover include the growth in cattle herd size since their introduction around 1,000 years ago, continued reliance on charcoal as a fuel for cooking, and increased prominence of coffee as a cash crop over the past century.

According to a conservative estimate, about 40% of the island's original forest cover was lost from the 1950s to 2000, with a thinning of remaining forest areas by 80%. In addition to traditional agricultural practice, wildlife conservation is challenged by the illicit harvesting of protected forests, as well as the state-sanctioned harvesting of precious woods within national parks. Although banned by then-President Ravalomanana from 2000 to 2009, the collection of small quantities of precious timber from national parks was re-authorized in January 2009 and dramatically intensified under the administration of Rajoelina as a key source of state revenues to offset cuts in donor support following Ravalomanana's ousting.

Invasive species have likewise been introduced by human populations. Following the 2014 discovery in Madagascar of the Asian common toad, a relative of a toad species that has severely harmed wildlife in Australia since the 1930s, researchers warned that it could "wreak havoc on the country's unique fauna." Habitat destruction and hunting have threatened many of Madagascar's endemic species or driven them to extinction. The island's elephant birds, a family of endemic giant ratites, became extinct in the 17th century or earlier, most probably because of human hunting of adult birds and poaching of their large eggs for food. Numerous giant lemur species vanished with the arrival of human settlers on the island, and others became extinct over the course of the centuries as a growing human population put greater pressures on lemur habitats and, among some populations, increased the rate of lemur hunting for food.

A July 2012 assessment found that the exploitation of natural resources since 2009 had had dire consequences for the island's wildlife: 90% of lemur species were found to be threatened with extinction, the highest proportion of any mammalian group, of which 23 species were classified as critically endangered. A 2023 study published in Nature Communications found that 120 of the 219 mammal species found only on Madagascar were threatened with extinction.

In 2003, Ravalomanana announced the Durban Vision, an initiative to more than triple the island's protected natural areas to over 60,000 km^{2} (23,000 sq mi) or 10% of Madagascar's land surface. As of 2011, areas protected by the state included five Strict Nature Reserves (Réserves Naturelles Intégrales), 21 Wildlife Reserves (Réserves Spéciales), and 21 National Parks (Parcs Nationaux). In 2007 six of the national parks—Marojejy, Masoala, Ranomafana, Zahamena, Andohahela, and Andringitra—were declared a joint world heritage site under the name Rainforests of the Atsinanana. Local timber merchants have been harvesting scarce species of rosewood trees from protected rainforests within Marojejy National Park and exporting the wood to China for the production of luxury furniture and musical instruments.

Conservation International Madagascar is Madagascar's country programme within Conservation International, with a central office in Antananarivo and regional branches in Fianarantsoa and Toamasina. Its work has included support for protected-area and landscape initiatives, including forest corridor management in eastern and southeastern Madagascar such as the Ambositra-Vondrozo Forest Corridor and the Ankeniheny-Zahamena Corridor.

== Government ==
=== Structure ===
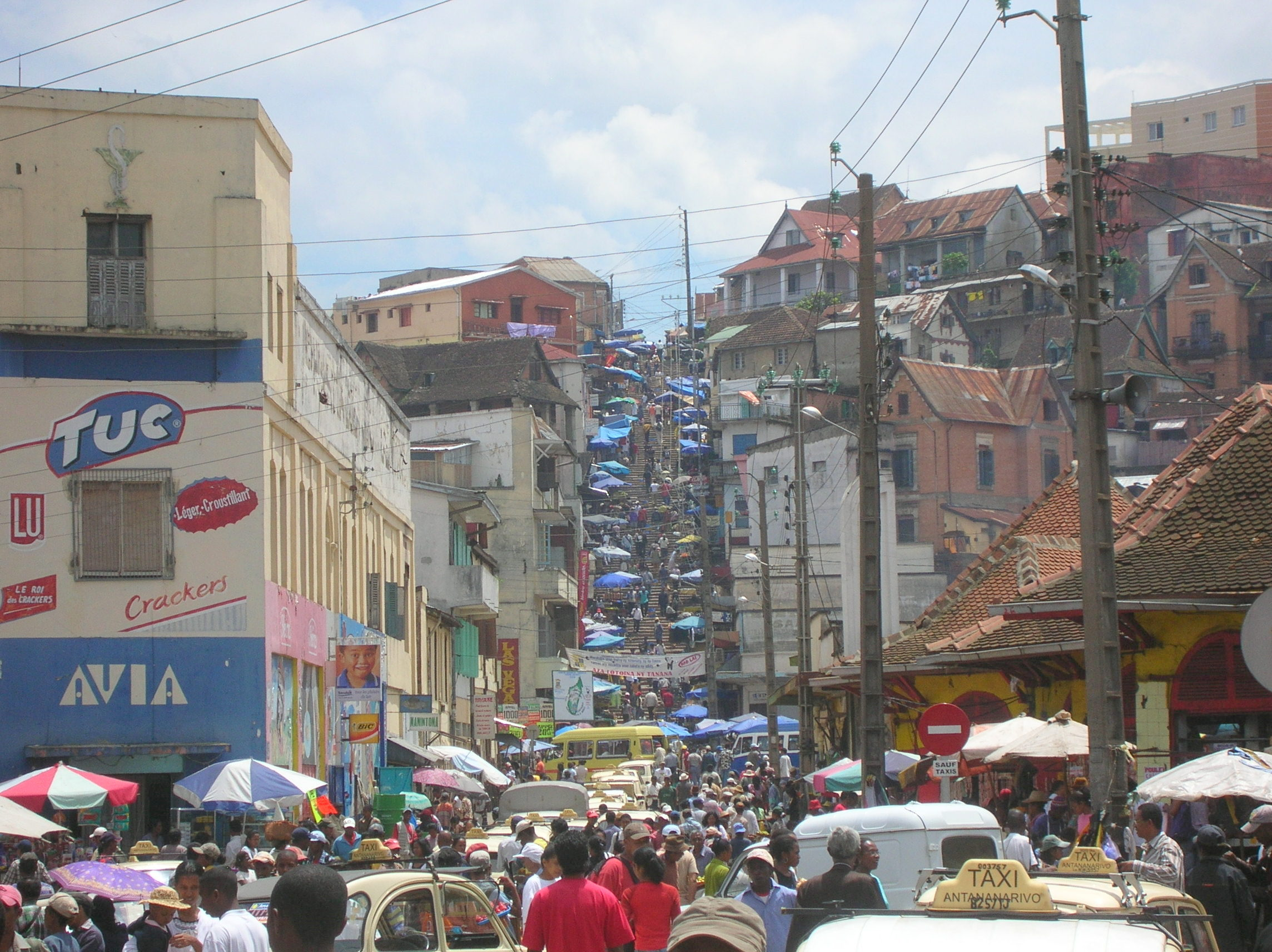
Antananarivo, the political and economic capital of Madagascar

Madagascar is a semi-presidential representative democratic multi-party republic, wherein the popularly elected president is the head of state. He selects a prime minister, who recommends candidates to him to form his cabinet of ministers. According to the Constitution, executive power is exercised by the government, whereas legislative power is vested in the ministerial cabinet, the Senate, and the National Assembly—although in reality the two latter bodies have very little power or legislative role. The Constitution establishes independent executive, legislative, and judicial branches, and mandates that each president is limited to a maximum of three terms. The public directly elects the president and the 151 members of the National Assembly to five-year terms. All 18 members of the Senate also serve five-year terms, with 12 senators elected by local officials and six appointed by the president.

At the local level, the island's 23 regions are administered by a governor and regional council. Provinces are further subdivided into regions and communes. The judiciary is modeled on the French system, with a high constitutional court, high court of justice, supreme court, court of appeals, criminal tribunals, and tribunals of first instance. The courts, which adhere to civil law, lack the capacity to quickly and transparently try the cases in the judicial system, which often forces defendants to pass lengthy pretrial detentions in unsanitary and overcrowded prisons.

Antananarivo, the administrative capital and largest city of Madagascar, is located in the highlands region, near the island's geographic center. King Andrianjaka founded Antananarivo as the capital of his Imerina Kingdom around 1610 or 1625 upon the site of a captured Vazimba capital on the hilltop of Analamanga. As Merina dominance expanded over neighboring Malagasy peoples in the early 19th century to establish the Kingdom of Madagascar, Antananarivo became the administrative center for virtually the entire island. In 1896 the French colonizers of Madagascar adopted the Merina capital as their center of colonial administration, and that city remained Madagascar's capital after the country regained independence in 1960. In 2017, the capital's population was estimated at 1,391,433 inhabitants. After Antananarivo, the country's next largest cities are Antsirabe, Toamasina, and Mahajanga.

=== Politics ===
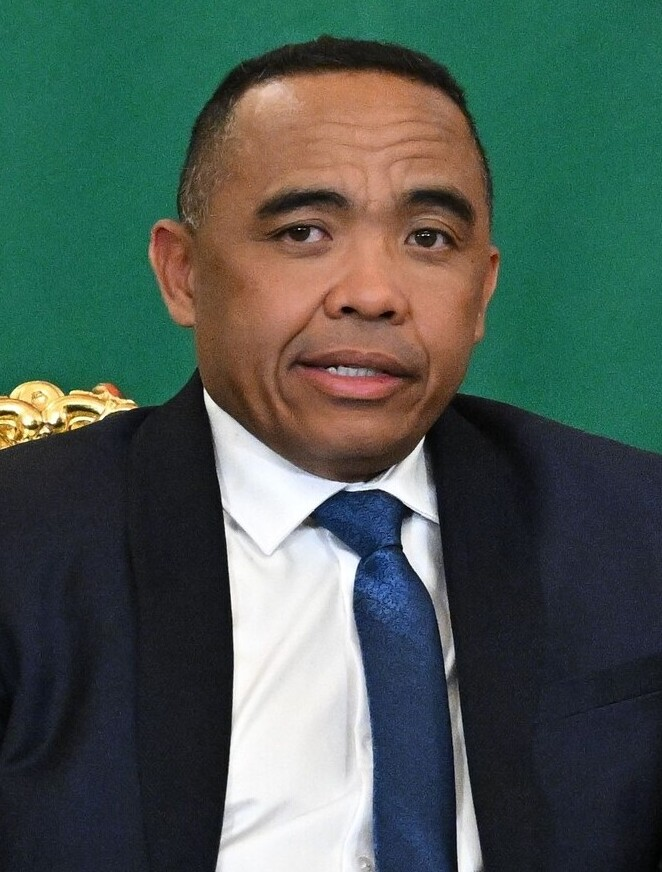
Michael Randrianirina, President of Madagascar and President of the Council of the Presidency for the Re-Foundation.

Since Madagascar's independence from France in 1960, the island's political transitions have been marked by numerous popular protests, several disputed elections, an impeachment, two military coups, and an assassination. The country's recurrent political crises have often been prolonged, with detrimental effects on the local economy, international relations, and Malagasy living standards. For example, the eight-month standoff between incumbent Ratsiraka and challenger Ravalomanana following the 2001 presidential elections cost Madagascar millions of dollars in lost tourism and trade revenue as well as damage to infrastructure, such as bombed bridges and buildings damaged by arson. A series of protests led by Andry Rajoelina against Ravalomanana in early 2009 became violent, with more than 170 people killed.

Modern politics in Madagascar are also colored by the history of the Merina subjugation of coastal communities under their rule in the 19th century. The consequent tension between the highland and coastal populations has periodically flared up into isolated events of violence.

Madagascar has historically been perceived as being on the margin of mainstream African affairs, despite its being a founding member of the Organization of African Unity, established in 1963 and dissolved in 2002 to be replaced by the African Union. The country was not permitted to attend the first African Union summit because of a dispute over the results of the 2001 presidential election, but rejoined the Union in July 2003 after a 14-month hiatus. Again it was suspended by the African Union in March 2009, however, following the unconstitutional transfer of executive power to Rajoelina.

Madagascar is a member of the International Criminal Court with a bilateral immunity agreement of protection for the United States military. Eleven countries have established embassies in Madagascar, including France, the United Kingdom, the United States, China, and India; and Madagascar has embassies in 16 other countries.

Human rights in Madagascar are protected under the Constitution and the state is a signatory to numerous international agreements including the Universal Declaration of Human Rights and the Convention on the Rights of the Child. Religious, ethnic, and sexual minorities are protected under the law. Freedom of association and assembly are also guaranteed under the law, although in practice the denial of permits for public assembly has occasionally been used to impede political demonstrations. Torture by security forces is rare and state repression is low relative to other countries with comparably few legal safeguards, although arbitrary arrests and the corruption of military and police officers remain problems. Ravalomanana's 2004 creation of BIANCO, an anti-corruption bureau, resulted in reduced corruption among Antananarivo's lower-level bureaucrats in particular, although high-level officials have not been prosecuted by the bureau. Accusations of media censorship have risen due to the alleged restrictions on the coverage of government opposition. Some journalists have been arrested for allegedly spreading fake news.

=== Military and law enforcement ===
The rise of centralized kingdoms among the Sakalava, Merina, and other ethnic groups produced the island's first standing armies by the 16th century, initially equipped with spears but later with muskets, cannons, and other firearms. By the early 19th century, the Merina sovereigns of the Kingdom of Madagascar had brought much of the island under their control by mobilizing an army of trained and armed soldiers numbering as high as 30,000. French attacks on coastal towns in the later part of the century prompted then-Prime Minister Rainilaiarivony to solicit British assistance to provide training to the Merina monarchy's army. Despite the training and leadership provided by British military advisers, the Malagasy army was unable to withstand French weaponry and was forced to surrender following an attack on the royal palace at Antananarivo. Madagascar was declared a colony of France in 1897.

The political independence and sovereignty of the Malagasy armed forces, comprising an army, navy, and air force, was restored with independence from France in 1960. Since this time, the Malagasy military has never engaged in armed conflict with another state or within its own borders, but has occasionally intervened to restore order during periods of political unrest. Under the socialist Second Republic, Admiral Didier Ratsiraka instituted mandatory national armed or civil service for all young citizens regardless of sex, a policy that remained in effect from 1976 to 1991. The armed forces are under the direction of the Minister of Defense and have remained largely neutral during times of political crisis, as during the protracted standoff between incumbent Ratsiraka and challenger Ravalomanana in the disputed 2001 presidential elections, when the military refused to intervene in favor of either candidate. This tradition was broken in 2009, when a segment of the army defected to the side of Rajoelina, then-mayor of Antananarivo, in support of his attempt to force President Ravalomanana from power.

The Minister of Interior is responsible for the national police force, the paramilitary force (gendarmerie), and the secret police. The police and gendarmerie are stationed and administered at the local level; however, in 2009 fewer than a third of all communes had access to the services of these security forces, with most lacking local-level headquarters for either corps. Traditional community tribunals, called dina, are presided over by elders and other respected figures and remain a key means by which justice is served in rural areas where state presence is weak. Historically, security has been relatively high across the island. Violent crime rates are low, and criminal activities are predominantly crimes of opportunity such as pickpocketing and petty theft, although child prostitution, human trafficking, and production and sale of marijuana and other illegal drugs are increasing. Budget cuts since 2009 had a severe impact on the national police force, producing a steep increase in criminal activity in the following years.

=== Administrative divisions ===
Madagascar is subdivided into 23 regions (faritra). The regions are further subdivided into 119 districts, 1,579 communes, and 17,485 fokontany (local neighborhoods, villages, or hamlets).

Regions of Madagascar

Number on map	Region's name	Area (km^{2})	Population (2018 census)	Population density per km^{2}	Capital	Former province
1	Diana	19,266	889,736	36.3	Antsiranana	Antsiranana
2	Sava	25,518	1,123,013	38.4	Sambava	Antsiranana
3	Itasy	6,993	897,962	104.8	Miarinarivo	Antananarivo
4	Analamanga	16,911	3,618,128	198.0	Antananarivo	Antananarivo
5	Vakinankaratra	16,599	2,074,358	108.6	Antsirabe	Antananarivo
6	Bongolava	16,688	674,474	27.4	Tsiroanomandidy	Antananarivo
7	Sofia	50,100	1,500,227	24.9	Antsohihy	Mahajanga
8	Boeny	31,046	931,171	25.8	Mahajanga	Mahajanga
9	Betsiboka	30,025	394,561	9.8	Maevatanana	Mahajanga
10	Melaky	38,852	309,805	7.5	Maintirano	Mahajanga
11	Alaotra-Mangoro	31,948	1,255,514	32.1	Ambatondrazaka	Toamasina
12	Atsinanana	21,934	1,484,403	57.9	Toamasina	Toamasina
13	Analanjirofo	21,930	1,152,345	47.2	Fenoarivo Atsinanana	Toamasina
14	Amoron'i Mania	16,141	833,919	44.3	Ambositra	Fianarantsoa
15	Matsiatra Ambony	21,080	1,447,296	56.9	Fianarantsoa	Fianarantsoa
16	Vatovavy	12,775	705,675	72.2	Mananjary	Fianarantsoa
17	Atsimo-Atsinanana	18,863	1,026,674	47.6	Farafangana	Fianarantsoa
18	Ihorombe	26,391	418,520	11.8	Ihosy	Fianarantsoa
19	Menabe	46,121	700,577	12.8	Morondava	Toliara
20	Atsimo-Andrefana	66,236	1,799,088	19.9	Toliara	Toliara
21	Androy	19,317	903,376	38.0	Ambovombe-Androy	Toliara
22	Anosy	25,731	809,313	26.1	Tôlanaro	Toliara
23	Fitovinany	19,605	1,435,882	72.2	Manakara	Fianarantsoa

=== United Nations involvement ===
Madagascar became a member state of the United Nations on 20 September 1960, shortly after gaining its independence on 26 June 1960. As of January 2017, 34 police officers from Madagascar were deployed in Haiti as part of the United Nations Stabilization Mission in Haiti.

In 2015, the United Nations (UN) World Food Programme started the Madagascar Country Programme with the two main goals of long-term development and reconstruction efforts and addressing of food insecurity issues in the country's southern regions by providing meals for specific schools in rural and urban priority areas and developing national school feeding policies to increase consistency of nourishment. Small and local farmers have also been assisted in increasing both the quantity and quality of their production, as well as improvement of their crop yield in unfavorable weather conditions.

In 2017, Madagascar signed the UN Treaty on the Prohibition of Nuclear Weapons.

== Economy ==
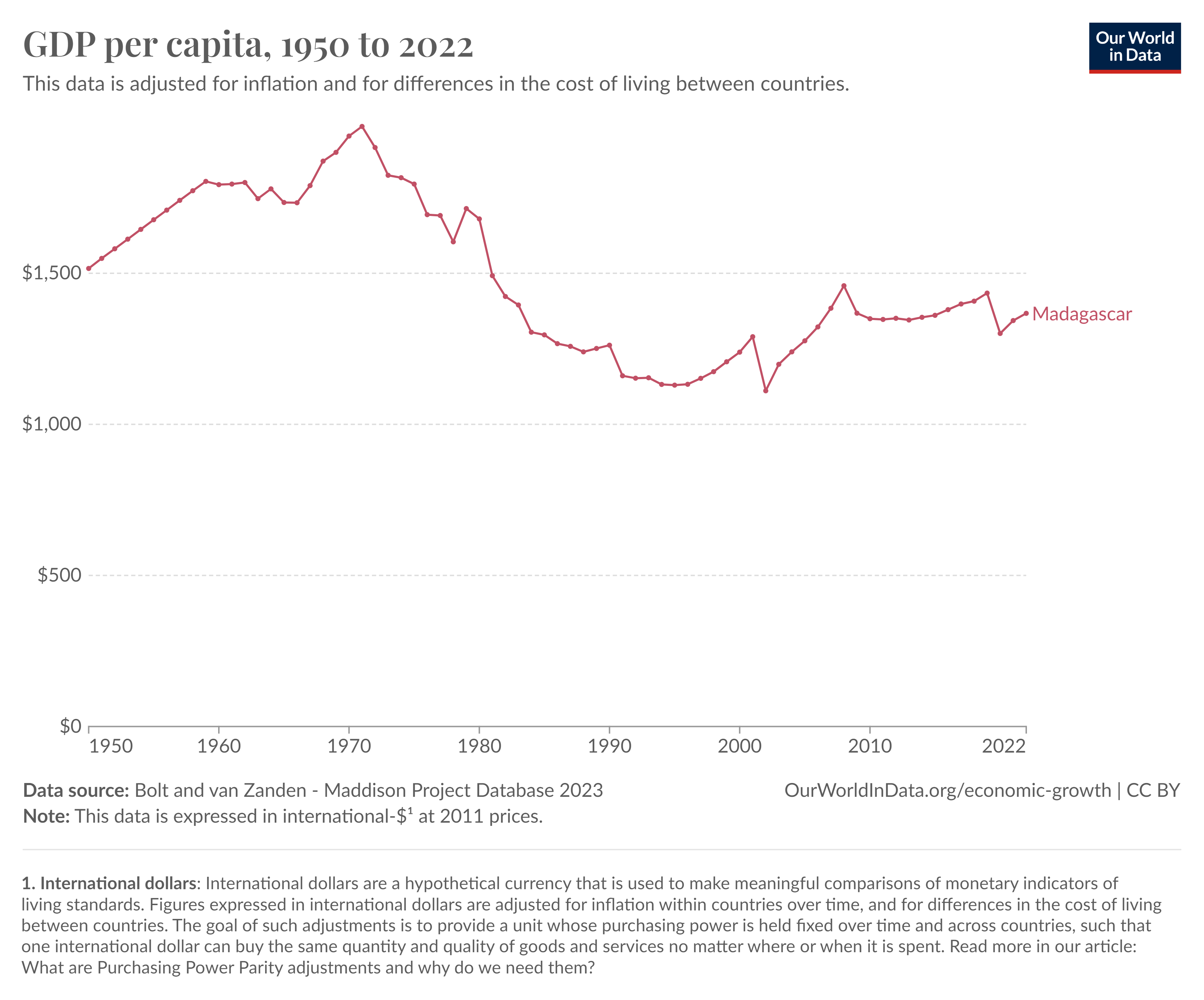
Historical change in per capita GDP of Madagascar since 1950

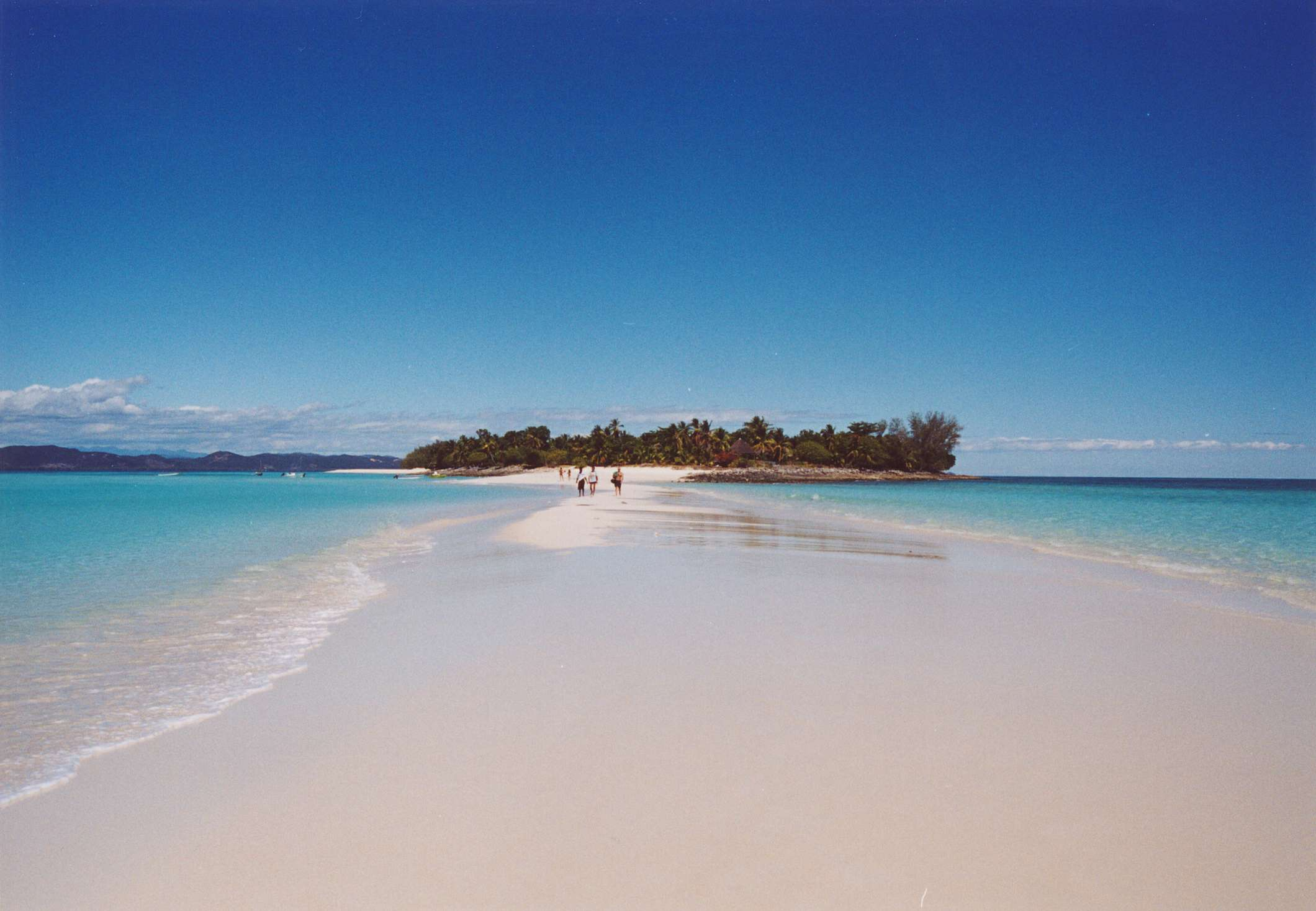
Nosy Iranja, one of the international tourism destinations in Madagascar

Madagascar's GDP in 2015 was estimated at US$9.98 billion, with a per-capita GDP of $411.82. Approximately 69% of the population lived below the national poverty line threshold of one dollar per day; and according to the United Nations Development Programme, 68.4% of the population was multidimensionally poor as of 2021.

During 2011–15, the country's average growth rate was 2.6% but expected to have reached 4.1% in 2016, due to public works programs and growth of the service sector. As of 2011, the agriculture sector constituted 29% of the GDP, with manufacturing at 15%. Madagascar's other sources of growth have been tourism, agriculture, and the extractive industries. The fishing sector represents US$800 million or 6% of GNP and directly employs 200,000 jobs.

Tourism focuses on the niche ecotourism market, capitalizing on Madagascar's unique biodiversity, unspoiled natural habitats, national parks, and lemur species. An estimated 365,000 tourists visited Madagascar in 2008, but the sector declined during the political crisis in 2010 with only 180,000 tourists visiting. It then grew steadily for a few years. In 2016, 293,000 tourists came to the island, representing an increase of 20% compared to 2015. The country had the goal of drawing 366,000 visitors in 2017 and 500,000 in 2018.

Madagascar was still a very poor country in 2018 and structural brakes remained on its development: corruption and the shackles of the public administration, lack of legal certainty, and backward land legislation. The economy, however, had grown since 2011, with GDP growth exceeding 4% per year. Almost all economic indicators were also growing: the GDP per capita was around $1,600 (PPP) for 2017, one of the lowest in the world, although growing since 2012; unemployment was also cut, which in 2016 was equal to 2.1% with a work force of 13.4 million as of 2017.

In 2017, poverty affected 92% of Madagascar's population. The country ranked fourth globally in terms of chronic malnutrition, with nearly one in two children under the age of five experiencing stunted growth. Additionally, it was among the five countries where access to clean water was most limited. According to the NGO WaterAid, in 2021 approximately 12 million people lacked access to safe drinking water.

As of 2025, poverty affected approximately 80% of Madagascar's population, based on a daily income threshold of $2.15 (2017 PPP), and nearly 1.94 million people were projected to experience high levels of acute food insecurity during the lean season. Access to clean water is a critical issue, as Madagascar remains a water-stressed country, with climate shocks and infrastructure gaps exacerbating the crisis.

=== Natural resources and trade ===
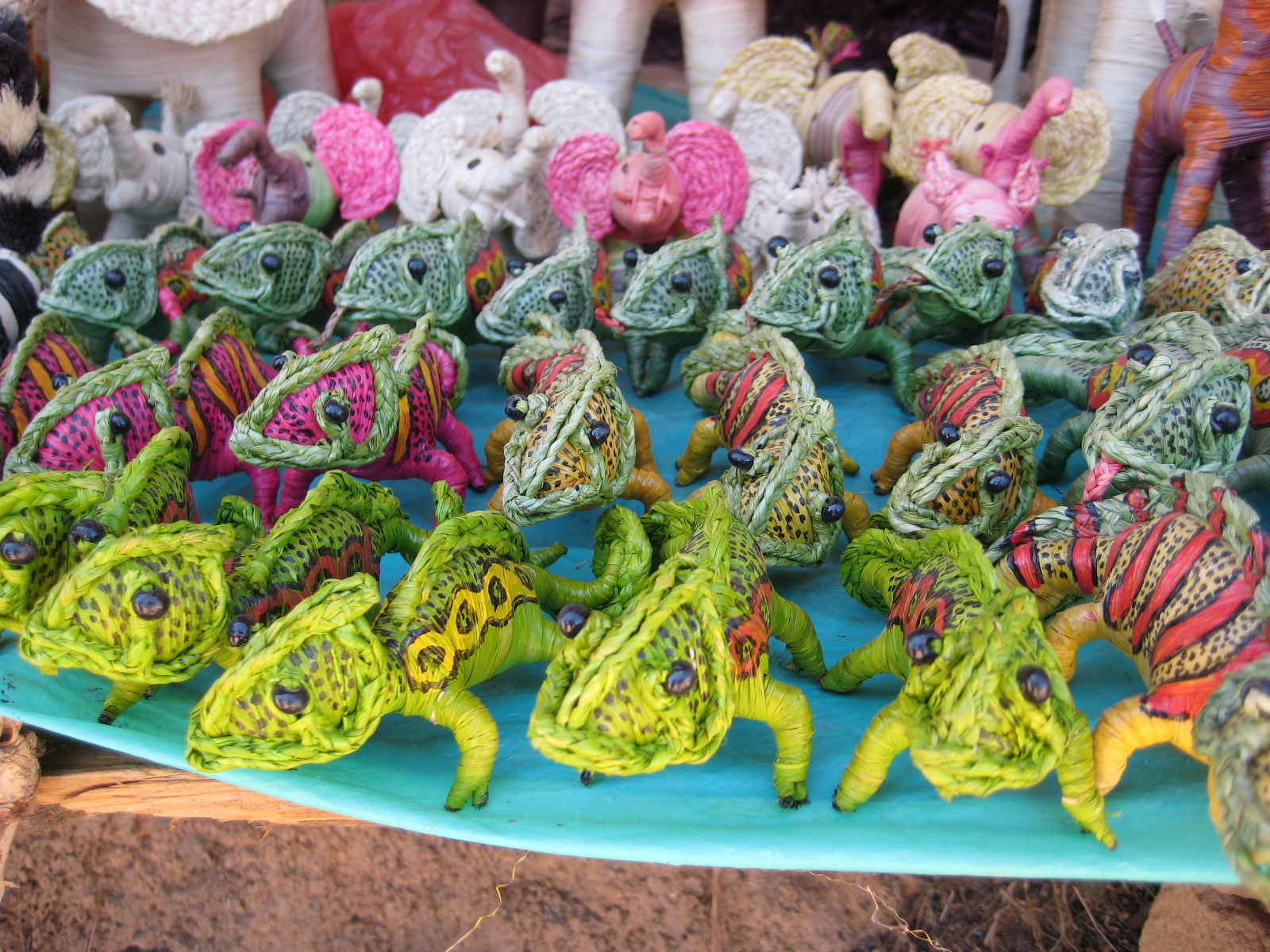
Toy animals made from raffia, a native palm

Madagascar's natural resources include a variety of agricultural and mineral products. Agriculture (including the growing of raffia), mining, fishing, and forestry are mainstays of the economy. In 2017 the top exports were vanilla (US$894 million), nickel metal (US$414 million), cloves (US$288 million), knitted sweaters (US$184 million, and cobalt (US$143 million).

Madagascar is the world's principal supplier of vanilla, cloves, and ylang-ylang. The island supplies 80% of the world's natural vanilla. Other key agricultural resources include coffee, lychees, and shrimp. Key mineral resources include various types of precious and semi-precious stones, and as of 2001 it provided half of the world's supply of sapphires, which was discovered near Ilakaka in the late 1990s.

Madagascar has one of the world's largest reserves of ilmenite (titanium ore), as well as important reserves of chromite, coal, iron, cobalt, copper, and nickel. Several major projects are underway in the mining, oil, and gas sectors that are anticipated to give a significant boost to the Malagasy economy. These include such projects as ilmenite and zircon mining at the Mandena mine by Rio Tinto, extraction of nickel at the Ambatovy mine near Moramanga and its processing near Toamasina by Sherritt International, and development of the giant onshore heavy oil deposits at Tsimiroro and Bemolanga by Madagascar Oil.

Exports formed 28% of the GDP in 2009. Most of the country's export revenue is derived from the textiles industry, fish and shellfish, vanilla, cloves, and other foodstuffs. France is the nation's main trading partner, although the United States, Japan, and Germany also have strong economic ties with Madagascar. High-value cash crops for export such as lychees are more recent growth areas, with 18,000 tons sold abroad in 2023, of which 16,000 tons were exported to Europe.

The Madagascar-US Business Council was formed in May 2003 as a collaboration between the US Agency for International Development and Malagasy artisan producers to support the export of local handicrafts to foreign markets. Imports of items such as foodstuffs, fuel, vehicles, electronics, capital goods, and consumer goods consume an estimated 52% of the GDP. Madagascar obtains most of its imports from China, France, Iran, Mauritius, and Hong Kong.

=== Infrastructure and media ===
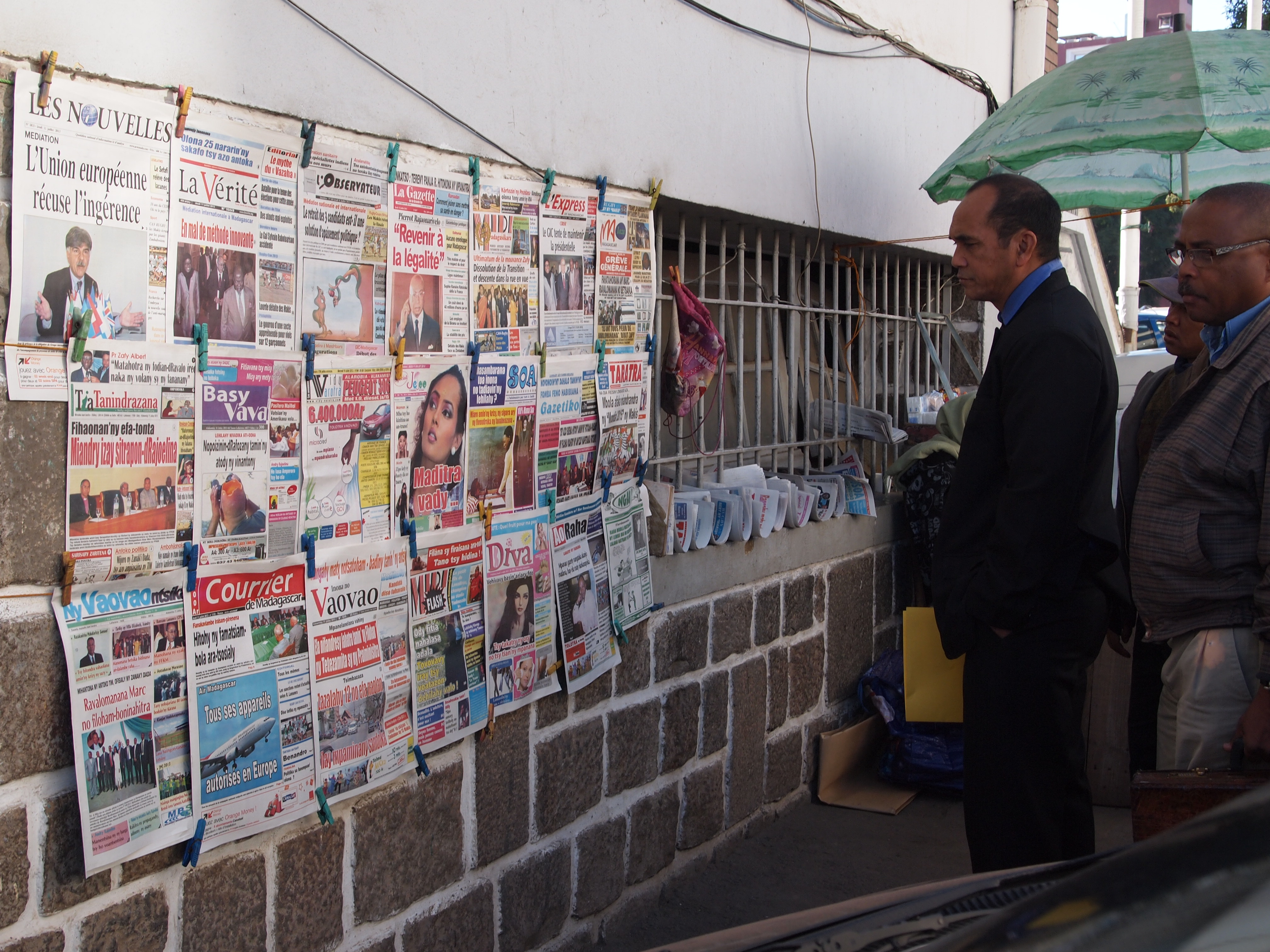
News stand in Antananarivo

In 2010, Madagascar had approximately 7,617 km (4,730 mi) of paved roads, 854 km (530 mi) of railways, and 432 km (270 mi) of navigable waterways. The majority of roads in Madagascar are unpaved, with many impassable in the rainy season. Largely paved national routes connect the six largest regional towns to Antananarivo, with minor paved and unpaved routes providing access to other population centers in each district. As of 2023, the World Bank estimated that 17 million people in Madagascar's rural areas live more than 2 km away from an all-season road.

Construction of the Antananarivo–Toamasina toll highway, the country's first toll highway, began in December 2022. The approximately US$1 billion infrastructure project, which would connect Madagascar's capital to its largest seaport, was expected to take four years to complete. Another project to create 348 km (216 mi) of roads and create better connections cost €235.5 million, including a €116 million grant from the European Union, a €110 million loan from the European Investment Bank, and €4.8 million in finance from the Republic of Madagascar.

There are several rail lines in Madagascar. Antananarivo is connected to Toamasina, Ambatondrazaka, and Antsirabe by rail, and another rail line connects Fianarantsoa to Manakara. In early 2026 a new passenger train service was launched in Antananarivo, to ease traffic in the capital.

The most important seaport in the country is located on the east coast at Toamasina. Ports at Mahajanga and Antsiranana are significantly less used because of their remoteness. Madagascar's government hopes to expand the ports of Antsiranana in the north and Taolagnaro in the south to connect them to improved road networks, as many imports are everyday necessities and the country also relies on export money. The island's newest port at Ehoala, constructed in 2008 and privately managed by Rio Tinto, will come under state control upon completion of the company's mining project near Tôlanaro around 2038.

Madagascar Airlines services the island's many small regional airports in the country, which offer the only practical means of access to many of the more remote regions during rainy season road washouts.

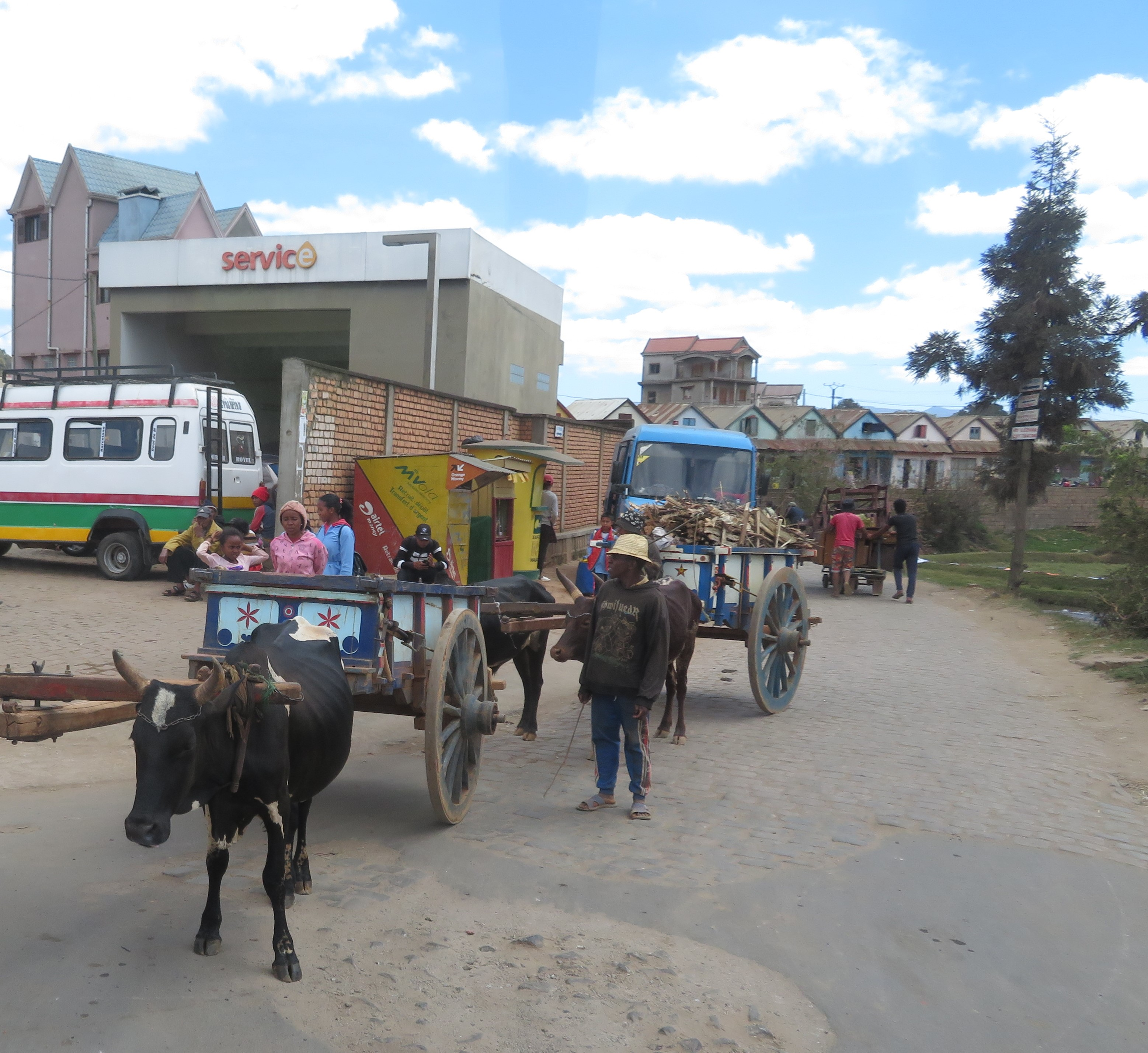
Oxcarts are an important medium of transport in many places, like Ambatolampy.

Running water and electricity are supplied at the national level by a government service provider, Jirama, which is unable to service the entire population. As of 2009, only 6.8% of Madagascar's fokontany had access to water provided by Jirama and 9.5% had access to its electricity services. Fifty-six percent of Madagascar's power is provided by hydroelectric power plants, with the remaining 44% provided by diesel engine generators.

Mobile telephone and Internet access are widespread in urban areas but remain limited in rural parts of the island. Approximately 30% of the districts are able to access the nation's several private telecommunications networks via mobile (cell) telephones or landlines. As of 2023, 11% of the rural population had access to power.

Radio broadcasting remains the principal means by which the population accesses international, national, and local news, but only state radio broadcasts are transmitted across the entire island. Hundreds of public and private stations with local or regional range, however, provide alternatives to state broadcasting, providing local and international programming throughout the country. Several media outlets are owned by political partisans or politicians themselves, including the media groups MBS (owned by Ravalomanana) and Viva (owned by Rajoelina), which contributes to political polarization in reporting. Madagascar's media have historically come under varying degrees of pressure to censor their criticism of the government, with reporters occasionally threatened or harassed and media outlets periodically forced to close. Accusations of media censorship have increased since 2009 because of alleged intensification of restrictions on political criticism.

Internet access has grown dramatically in the 21st century. In December 2011, an estimated 352,000 Madagascar residents had access from home or in one of the nation's many Internet cafés ; but by January 2022, 22.3% of the population (6.43 million people) had access, mostly through mobile phones.

== Demographics ==
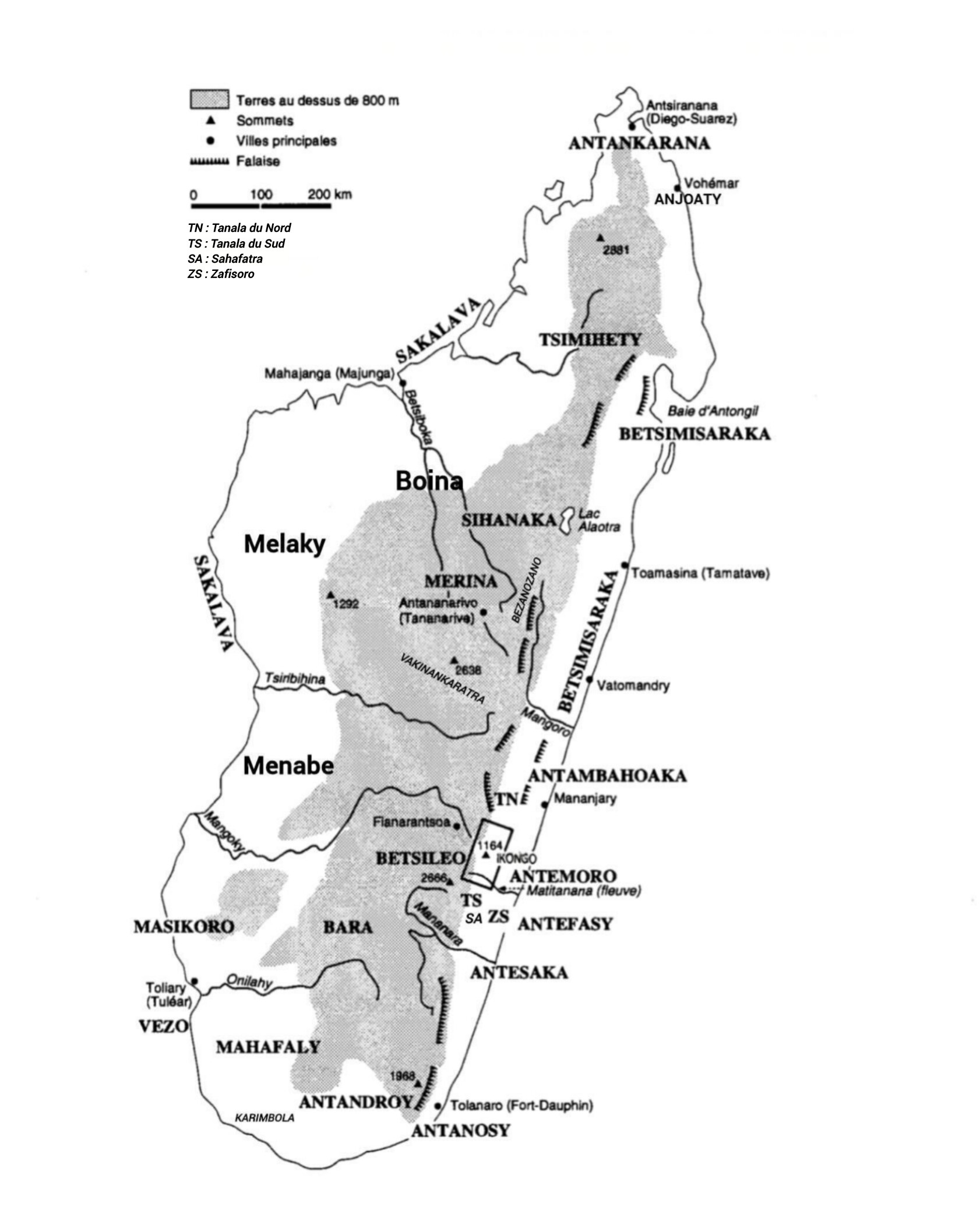
Ethnolinguistic map of Madagascar

Only two general censuses, in 1975 and 1993, have been carried out after independence. The most densely populated regions of the island are the Eastern Highlands and the Eastern Coast, contrasting most dramatically with the sparsely populated Western Plains. Agriculture has long influenced settlement on the island. Almost 60% of the nation's population live in rural areas.

In 2024, the population of Madagascar was estimated at 32 million, up from 2.2 million in 1900, and the annual population growth rate approximately 2.4%. As of 2024, approximately 39.3% of the population was younger than 15 years of age, 57.3% were between the ages of 15 and 64, and 3.4% were aged 65 and older.

=== Ethnic groups ===
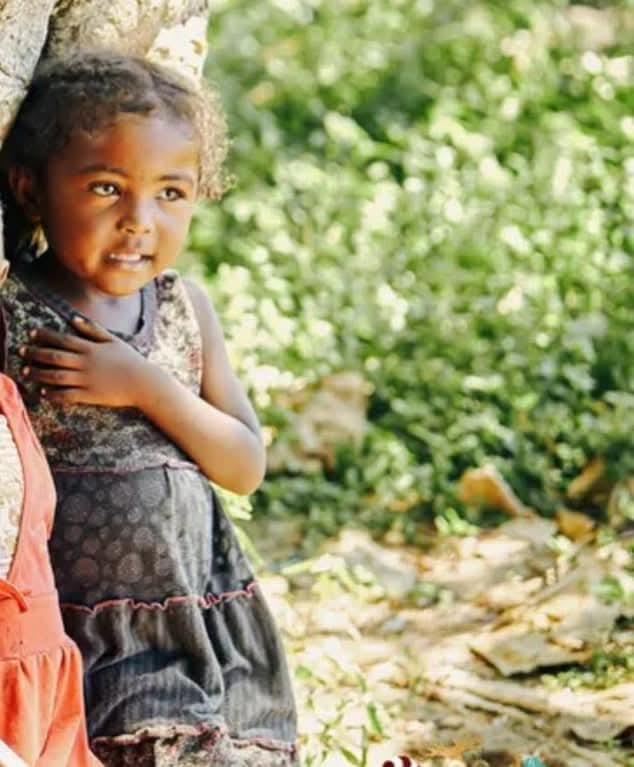
Antanosy girl with dark blond hair

The Malagasy ethnic group forms over 90% of Madagascar's population and is typically divided into 18 ethnic subgroups. Recent DNA research revealed that the genetic makeup of the average Malagasy person constitutes an approximately equal blend of Southeast Asian and East African genes, although the genetics of some communities show a predominance of Southeast Asian or East African origins or some Arab, Indian, or European ancestry.

Southeast Asian features—specifically from the southern part of Borneo—are most predominant among the Merina of the Central Highlands, who form the largest Malagasy ethnic subgroup at approximately 26% of the population, whereas certain communities among the Western Coastal peoples (collectively called côtiers) have relatively stronger East African features. The largest coastal ethnic subgroups are the Betsimisaraka (14.9%) and the Tsimihety and Sakalava (6% each).

Malagasy ethnic subgroups	Regional concentration
Antankarana, Sakalava, Tsimihety	Former Antsiranana Province; north and northwestern coasts
Sakalava, Vezo	Former Mahajanga Province; western coast
Betsimisaraka, Sihanaka, Bezanozano	Former Toamasina Province; eastern coast
Merina	Former Antananarivo Province; central highlands
Betsileo, Antaifasy, Antambahoaka, Antaimoro, Antaisaka, Tanala	Former Fianarantsoa Province; southeastern coast
Mahafaly, Antandroy, Antanosy people, Bara, Vezo	Former Toliara Province; southern inland regions and coast

Chinese, Indian and Comoran minorities are present in Madagascar, as well as a small European (primarily French) populace. Emigration in the late 20th century has reduced these minority populations, occasionally in abrupt waves, such as the exodus of Comorans in 1976, following anti-Comoran riots in Mahajanga. By comparison, there has been no significant emigration of Malagasy peoples. The number of Europeans has declined since independence, reduced from 68,430 in 1958 to 17,000 three decades later. There were an estimated 25,000 Comorans, 18,000 Indians, and 9,000 Chinese living in Madagascar in the mid-1980s.

=== Largest cities ===
Largest cities or towns in Madagascar According to the 2018 Census
Rank	Name	Region	Pop.
1	Antananarivo	Analamanga	1,275,207
2	Toamasina	Atsinanana	326,286
3	Antsirabe	Vakinankaratra	245,592
4	Mahajanga	Boeny	244,722
5	Fianarantsoa	Haute Matsiatra	189,879
6	Toliara	Atsimo-Andrefana	169,760
7	Antsiranana	Diana	131,165
8	Hell-Ville	Diana	109,365
9	Sambava	Sava	85,659
10	Taolagnaro	Anosy	67,188

=== Languages ===
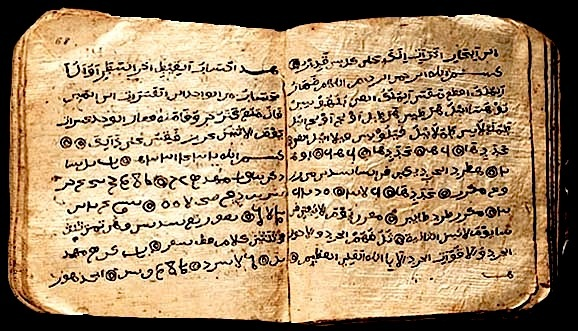
Sorabe Malagasy Arabic script

The Constitution of 2007 recognized three official languages: Malagasy, French, and English. A fourth Constitution, adopted in 2010 following a constitutional referendum, recognized only Malagasy and French.

The Malagasy language is of Malayo-Polynesian origin and is generally spoken throughout the island. The numerous dialects of Malagasy, which are generally mutually intelligible, can be clustered under three subgroups: Central-Eastern Malagasic, Northern Malagasic, and Southern Malagasic.

The Malagasy language derives from the Southeast Barito languages, with the Maʼanyan language being its closest relative, incorporating numerous Malay and Javanese loanwords.

French became the official language during the colonial period, when Madagascar came under the authority of France. In the first national Constitution of 1958, Malagasy and French were named the official languages of the Malagasy Republic. Madagascar is a francophone country, and French is mostly spoken as a second language among the educated population and used for international communication. Among the upper class in large cities, French is spoken as a native language.

=== Religion ===
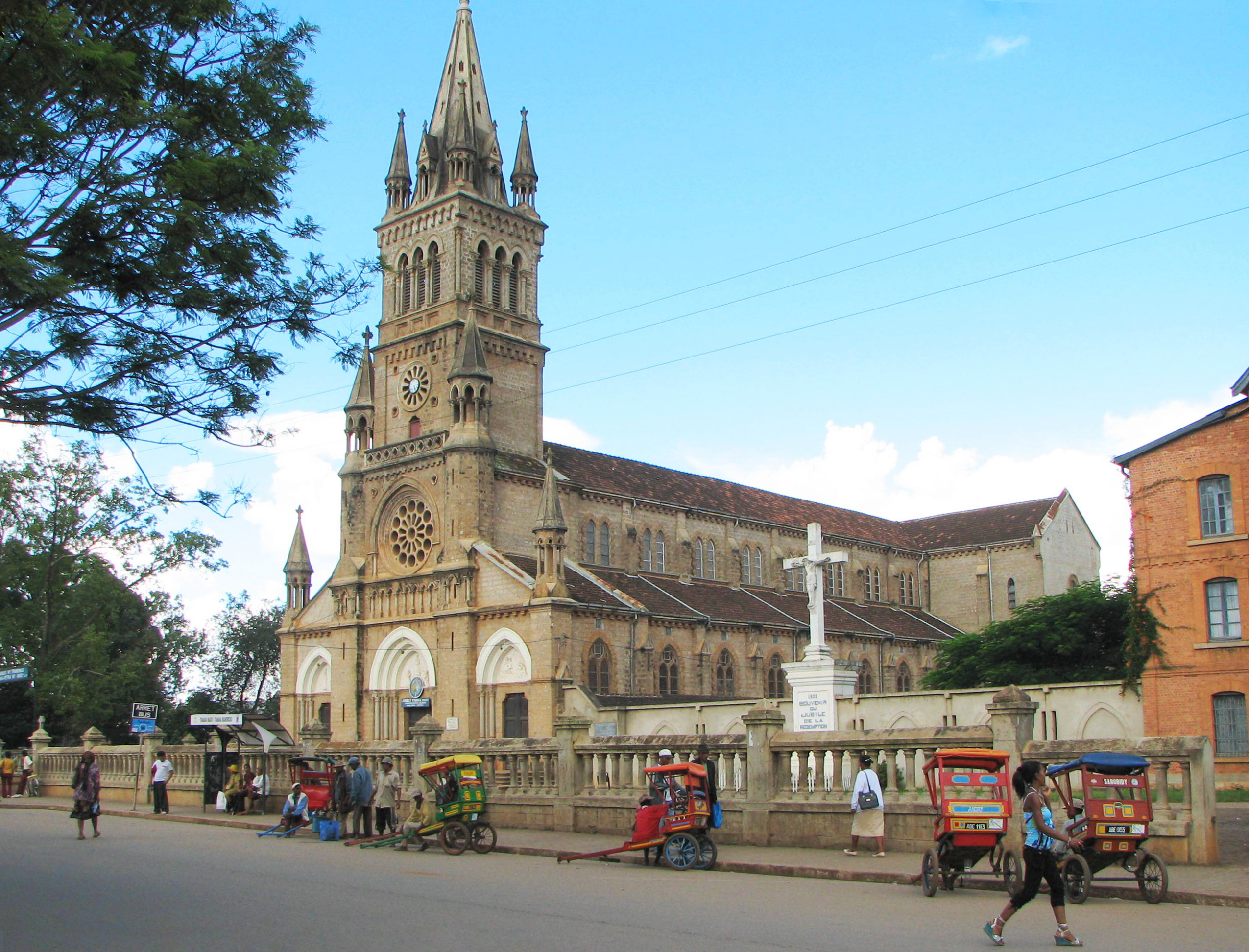
Our Lady of La Salette Cathedral in Antsirabe

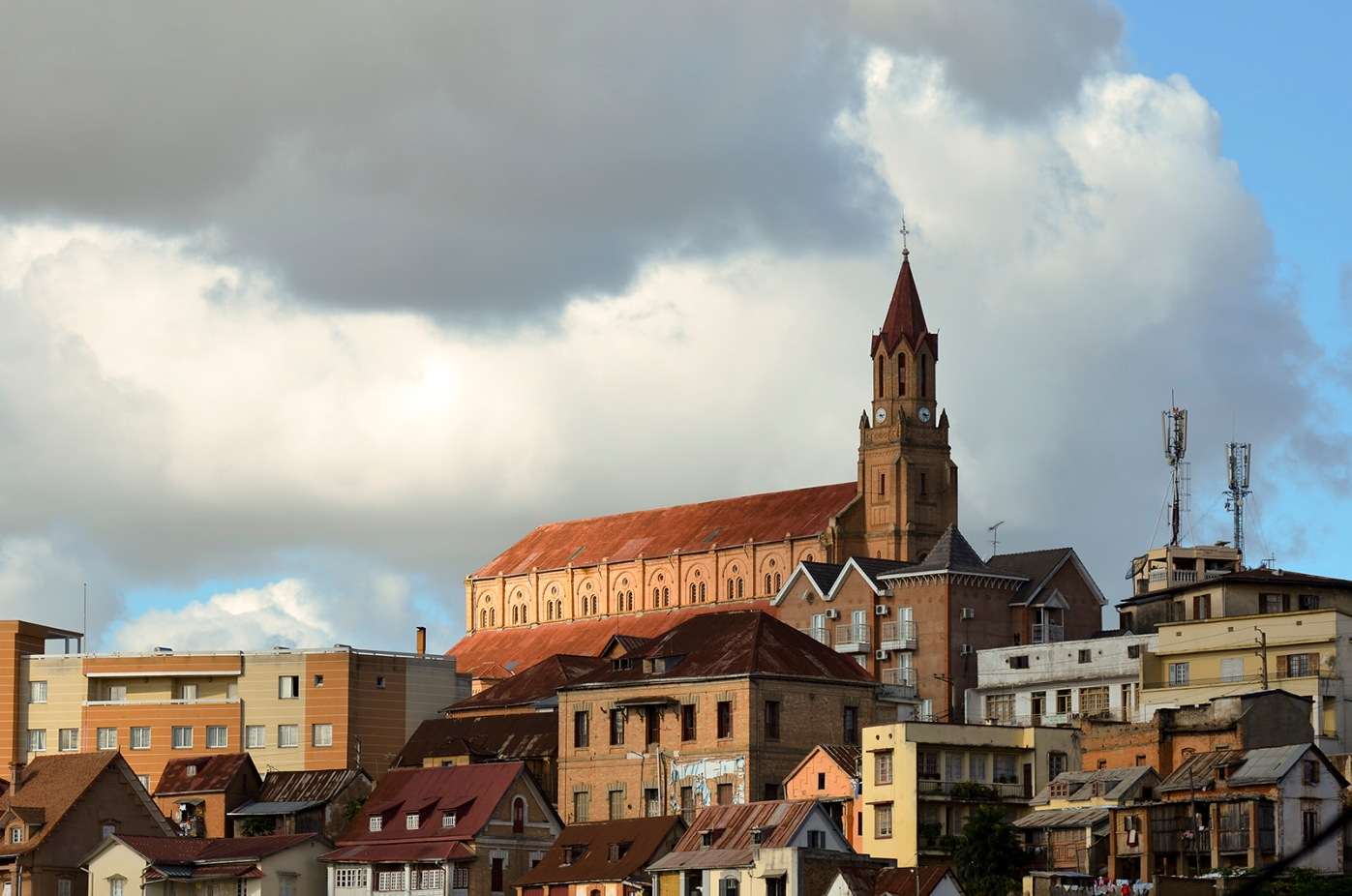
Faravohitra Catholic church in Antananarivo

Christianity is the most widely professed religion in Madagascar. It is predominant in the Highlands.

According to the most recent national census completed in 1993, a majority of the population (52%) adhered to Indigenous beliefs, with Christianity the largest single religion at 41%, followed by Islam at 7%. According to the Pew Research Center in 2010, however, 85% of the population identified as Christian, just 4.5% exclusively practiced folk religions; Protestants comprise a plurality of Christians, followed by Catholics. In contrast, the Association of Religion Data Archives, citing the World Religion Database, estimates that in 2025 58.1% of the population was Christian, 2.1% Muslim, 39.2% of traditional faiths, and 0.6% nonreligious or adhering to other faiths.

The inconsistency in religious data reflects the common practice of alternating between religious identities or syncretizing different faith traditions. Christians integrate and combine their religious beliefs with the deeply rooted practice of honoring ancestors. For instance, they may bless their dead at church before proceeding with traditional burial rites or invite a Christian minister to consecrate a famadihana reburial.

Veneration of ancestors has led to the widespread tradition of tomb-building as well as the Highlands practice of the famadihana, whereby a deceased family member's remains are exhumed and re-wrapped in fresh silk shrouds, before being replaced in the tomb. The famadihana is an occasion to celebrate the beloved ancestor's memory, reunite with family and community, and enjoy a festive atmosphere. Residents of surrounding villages are often invited to attend the party, where food and rum are typically served, and a hiragasy troupe or other musical entertainment is commonly present.

Consideration for ancestors is also demonstrated through adherence to fady, taboos that are respected during and after the lifetime of the person who establishes them. It is widely believed that by showing respect for ancestors in these ways, they may intervene on behalf of the living. Conversely, misfortunes are often attributed to ancestors whose memory or wishes have been neglected. The sacrifice of zebu is a traditional method used to appease or honor the ancestors. In addition, the Malagasy traditionally believe in a creator god, called Zanahary or Andriamanitra.

The Malagasy Council of Churches comprises the four oldest and most prominent Christian denominations of Madagascar (Catholic, Church of Jesus Christ in Madagascar, Lutheran, and Anglican) and has been influential in Malagasy politics.

Islam was first brought to Madagascar in the Middle Ages by Arab and Somali Muslim traders, who established several Islamic schools along the Eastern Coast. Whereas the use of Arabic script and loan words and the adoption of Islamic astrology would spread across the island, Islam took hold in only a handful of Southeastern Coastal communities. They are largely concentrated in the northwestern provinces of Mahajanga and Antsiranana. Muslims are divided between ethnic Malagasy and Indians, Pakistanis and Comorans.

Hinduism was introduced to Madagascar through Gujarati people immigrating from the Saurashtra region of India in the late 19th century. Most Hindus in Madagascar speak Gujarati or Hindi at home, reflecting the faith's concentration among those of Indian ancestry.

Rabbinic Judaism emerged on the island in the 21st century, as the common belief in a myth of Jewish origin for the Malagasy peoples inspired Messianic Jews in Antananarivo to begin researching Judaism and studying the Torah. In 2016, 121 members of the Malagasy Jewish community were formally converted to Orthodox Judaism.

=== Health ===
Medical centers, dispensaries, and hospitals are found throughout the island, although concentrated in urban areas and particularly in Antananarivo. Access to medical care remains beyond the reach of many Malagasy, especially in the rural areas, and many people have recourse to traditional healers.

In addition to the high expense of medical care relative to the average Malagasy income, the prevalence of trained medical professionals remained extremely low. In 2010, Madagascar had a total of 3,150 doctors, 5,661 nurses, 385 community health workers, 175 pharmacists, and 57 dentists for a population of 22 million, and an average of three hospital beds per 10,000 people. Fifteen percent of government spending was directed toward the health sector in 2008. As of 2011, approximately 70% of spending on health was contributed by the government and 30% by international donors and other private sources. The government also provided one basic health center per commune. Private health centers are concentrated within urban areas, particularly those of the Central Highlands.

Despite these barriers to access, health services have shown a trend toward improvement over the past 20 years. Child immunizations against such diseases as hepatitis B, diphtheria, and measles increased an average of 60% during this period, indicating low but increasing availability of basic medical services and treatment.

The Malagasy fertility rate in 2009 was 4.6 children per woman, declining from 6.3 in 1990. Teen pregnancy rates of 14.8% in 2011, much higher than the African average, were a contributing factor to rapid population growth. In 2010, the maternal mortality rate was 440 per 100,000 births, compared to 373.1 in 2008 and 484.4 in 1990, representing a decline in perinatal care following the 2009 coup. The infant mortality rate in 2011 was 41 per 1,000 births, with an under-five mortality rate at 61 per 1,000 births. Schistosomiasis, malaria, and sexually transmitted diseases are common in Madagascar, although as of 2011 the HIV infection rate remained low relative to many countries in mainland Africa, at 0.2% of the adult population; and the malaria mortality rate was also among Africa's lowest at 8.5 deaths per 100,000 people, in part because of the highest frequency use of insecticide-treated nets in Africa. Adult life expectancy as of 2009 was 63 years for men and 67 years for women.

Madagascar had outbreaks of the bubonic plague and pneumonic plague in 2017 (2,575 cases, 221 deaths) and earlier in 2014 (263 confirmed cases, 71 deaths). In 2019, Madagascar had a measles outbreak, resulting in 118,000 cases and 1,688 deaths and was also affected the next year by the COVID-19 pandemic. Undernourishment and hunger rates were at 42% in 2018. According to the United Nations, more than one million people in southern Madagascar in 2021 were struggling to get enough to eat, due to what could become the country's first famine caused by climate change. UNICEF has supported an initiative in the country assisting parents to recognise the signs of severe malnutrition among their children.

=== Education ===
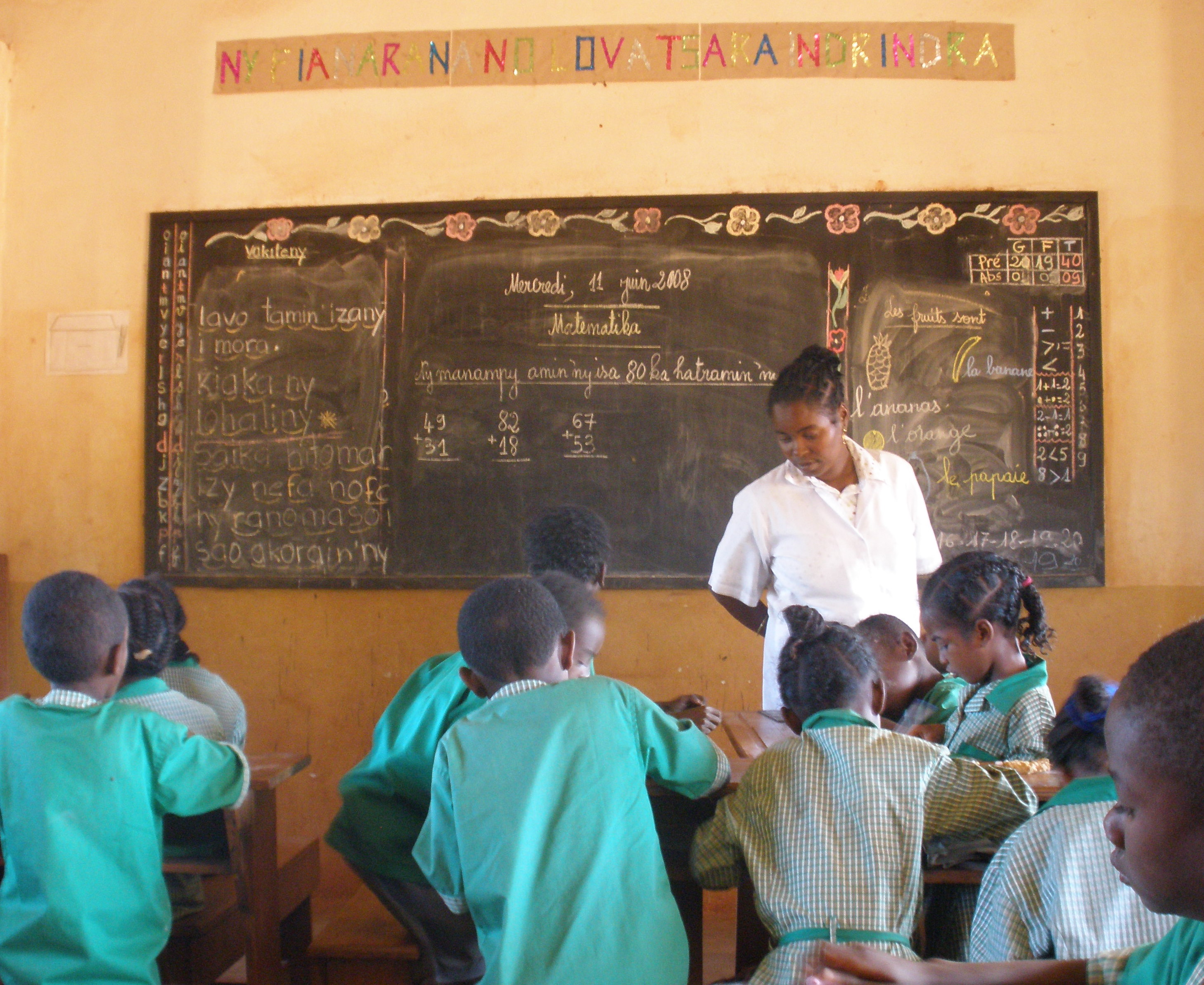
Education access and quality were prioritized under Ravalomanana.

Prior to the 19th century, all education in Madagascar was informal and typically served to teach practical skills as well as social and cultural values, including respect for ancestors and elders. The first formal European-style school was established in 1818 at Toamasina by members of the London Missionary Society (LMS). The LMS was invited by King Radama I to expand its schools throughout Imerina to teach basic literacy and numeracy to aristocratic children. The schools were closed by Ranavalona I in 1835, but reopened and expanded in the decades after her death.

By the end of the 19th century, Madagascar had the most developed and modern school system in pre-colonial Sub-Saharan Africa. Access to schooling was expanded in coastal areas during the colonial period, with French language and basic work skills becoming the focus of the curriculum. During the post-colonial First Republic, a continued reliance on French nationals as teachers, and French as the language of instruction, displeased those desiring a complete separation from the former colonial power. Consequently, under the socialist Second Republic, French instructors and other nationals were expelled, Malagasy was declared the language of instruction, and a large cadre of young Malagasy were rapidly trained to teach at remote rural schools under the mandatory two-year national service policy.

This policy, known as malgachization (Malagasyization), coincided with a severe economic downturn and a dramatic decline in the quality of education. Those schooled during this period generally failed to master the French language or many other subjects and struggled to find employment, forcing many to take low-paying jobs in the informal or black market that mired them in deepening poverty. Excepting Zafy's brief presidency from 1992 to 1996, Ratsiraka remained in power from 1975 to 2001 and failed to achieve significant improvements in education throughout his tenure.

Education was prioritized under the Ravalomanana administration (2002–09), free and compulsory from ages 6 to 13. The primary schooling cycle was five years, followed by four at the lower secondary level and three at the upper secondary level. During Ravalomanana's first term, thousands of new primary schools and additional classrooms were constructed, older buildings renovated, and tens of thousands of new primary teachers recruited and trained. Primary school fees were eliminated, and kits containing basic school supplies distributed to primary students.

Government school construction initiatives have ensured at least one primary school per fokontany and one lower secondary school within each commune. At least one upper secondary school is located in each of the larger urban centers. The three branches of the national public university are located at Antananarivo, Mahajanga, and Fianarantsoa. These are complemented by public teacher-training colleges and several private universities and technical colleges.

As a result of increased educational access, enrollment rates more than doubled between 1996 and 2006. However, education quality was weak, producing high rates of grade repetition and dropout. Education policy in Ravalomanana's second term focused on quality issues, including an increase in minimum education standards for the recruitment of primary teachers from a middle-school-leaving certificate (BEPC) to a high-school-leaving certificate (BAC), and a reformed teacher training program to support the transition from traditional didactic instruction to student-centered teaching methods to boost student learning and classroom participation. Public expenditure on education was 2.8% of GDP in 2014. The literacy rate was estimated at 75% in 2021.

== Culture ==
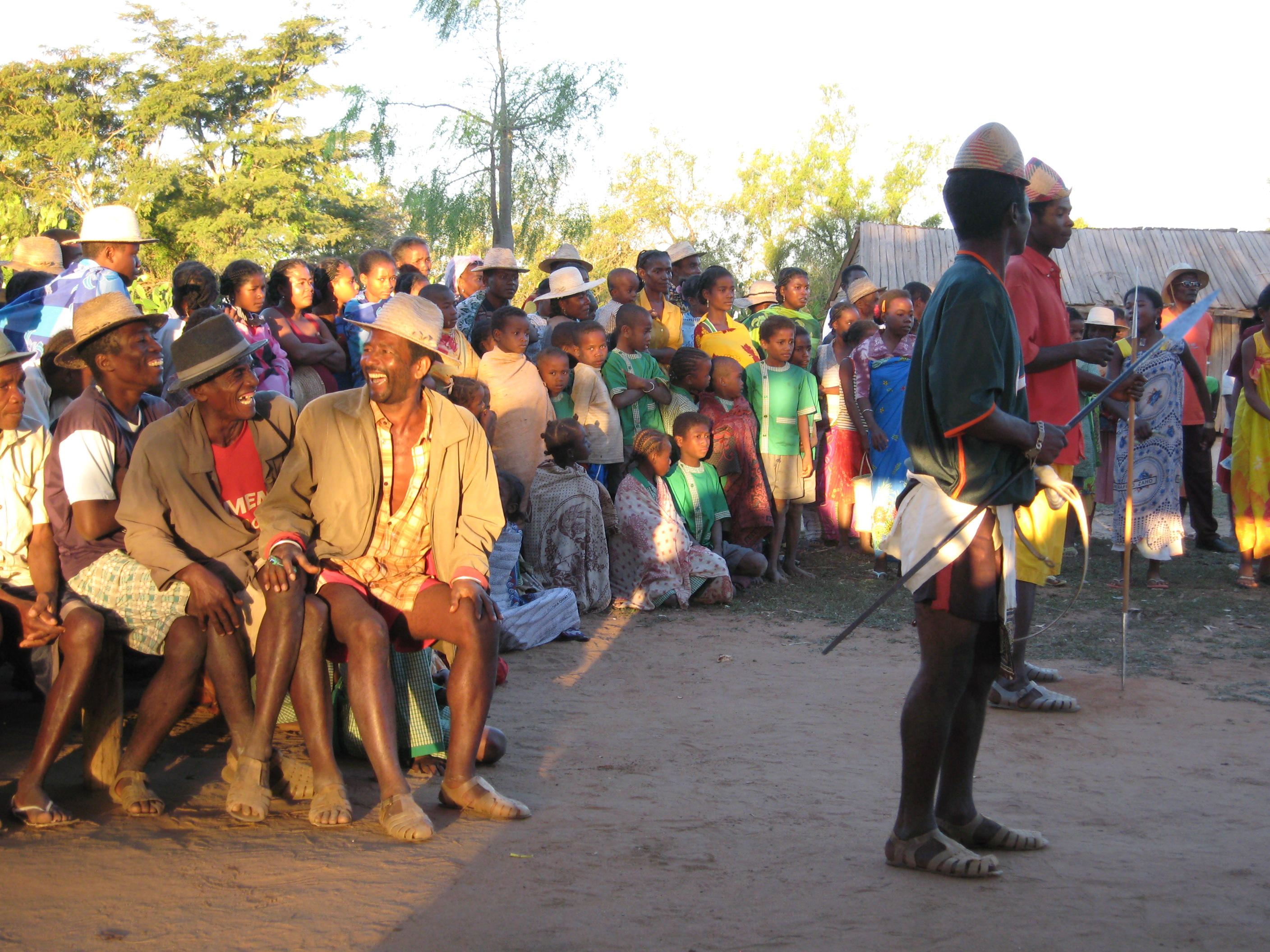
Performance of Antandroy dance

All the many ethnic subgroups in Madagascar adhere to their own set of beliefs, practices, and ways of life that have historically contributed to their unique identities. However, a number of core cultural features are common throughout the island, creating a strongly unified Malagasy cultural identity. In addition to a common language and shared traditional religious beliefs around a creator god and veneration of ancestors, the traditional Malagasy worldview is shaped by values that emphasize fihavanana (solidarity), vintana (destiny), tody (karma), and hasina, a sacred life force that traditional communities believe imbues and thereby legitimates authority figures within the community or family. Other cultural elements commonly found throughout the island include the practice of male circumcision; strong kinship ties; widespread belief in the power of magic, diviners, astrology and witch doctors; and a traditional division of social classes into nobles, commoners, and slaves.

Although social castes are no longer legally recognized, ancestral caste affiliation often continues to affect social status, economic opportunity, and roles within the community. Malagasy people traditionally consult Mpanandro ("Makers of the Days") to identify the most auspicious days for important events such as weddings or famadihana, according to a traditional astrological system introduced by Arabs. Similarly, the nobles of many Malagasy communities in the pre-colonial period would commonly employ advisers known as the ombiasy (from olona-be-hasina, "man of much virtue") of the southeastern Antemoro ethnic group, who trace their ancestry back to early Somali settlers.

The diverse origins of Malagasy culture are evident in its tangible expressions. The most emblematic instrument of Madagascar, the valiha, is a bamboo tube zither carried to the country by early settlers from southern Borneo, very similar in form to those found in Indonesia and the Philippines today. Traditional houses in Madagascar are likewise similar to those of southern Borneo in terms of symbolism and construction, featuring a rectangular layout with a peaked roof and central support pillar. Reflecting widespread veneration of the ancestors, tombs are culturally significant in many regions and tend to be built of more durable material, typically stone, and display more elaborate decoration than the houses of the living. The production and weaving of silk can be traced back to the island's earliest settlers, and Madagascar's national dress, the woven lamba, has evolved into a varied and refined art.

Southeast Asian cultural influence is also evident in Malagasy cuisine, in which rice is consumed at every meal, typically accompanied by one of a variety of flavorful vegetable or meat dishes. African influence is reflected in the sacred importance of zebu cattle and their embodiment of their owner's wealth, traditions originating on the African mainland. Cattle rustling, originally a rite of passage for young men in the plains areas of Madagascar where the largest herds of cattle are, has become a dangerous and sometimes deadly criminal enterprise, as herdsmen in the Southwest attempt to defend their cattle with traditional spears against increasingly armed professional rustlers.

=== Arts ===
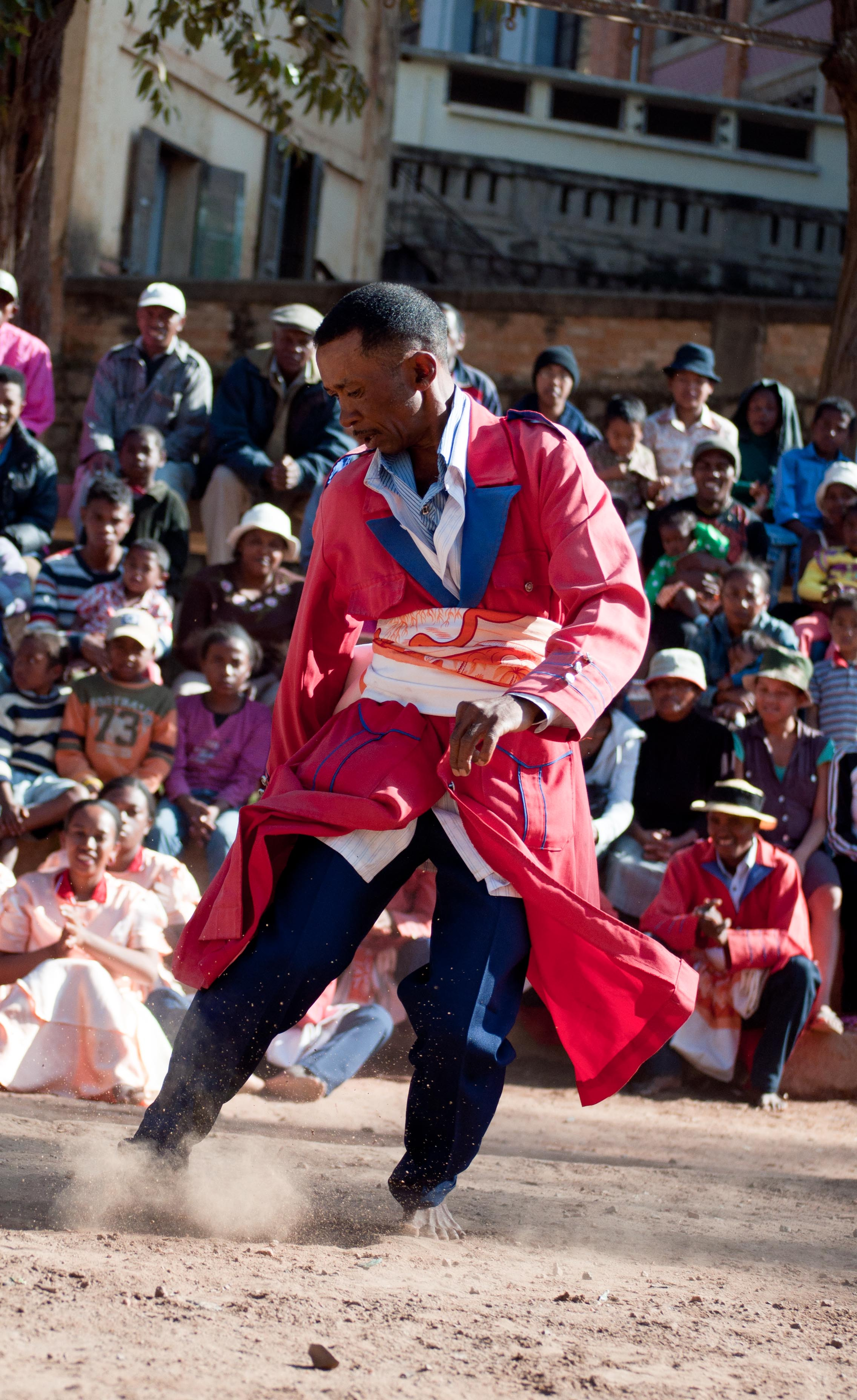
Hiragasy dancer

A wide variety of oral and written literature of Madagascar has developed. One of its foremost artistic traditions is its oratory, as expressed in the forms of hainteny (poetry), kabary (public discourse), and ohabolana (proverbs). An epic poem exemplifying these traditions, the Ibonia, has been handed down over the centuries in several different forms across the island, and offers insight into the diverse mythologies and beliefs of traditional Malagasy communities. This tradition was continued in the 20th century by such artists as Jean-Joseph Rabearivelo, who is considered Africa's first modern poet, and Elie Rajaonarison, an exemplar of the new wave of Malagasy poetry.

Madagascar has also developed a rich musical heritage, embodied in dozens of regional musical genres such as the coastal salegy or highland hiragasy that enliven village gatherings, local dance floors, and national airwaves. Madagascar also has a growing culture of classical music fostered through youth academies, organizations, and orchestras that promote youth involvement in this type of music.

The plastic arts are also widespread throughout the island. In addition to the tradition of silk weaving and lamba production, the weaving of raffia, and other local plant materials has been used to create a wide array of practical items such as floor mats, baskets, purses, and hats. Wood carving is a highly developed art form, with distinct regional styles evident in the decoration of balcony railings and other architectural elements. Sculptors create a variety of furniture and household goods, aloalo funerary posts, and wooden sculptures, many of which are produced for the tourist market. The decorative and functional woodworking traditions of the Zafimaniry people of the Central Highlands was inscribed on UNESCO's Intangible Cultural Heritage List in 2008.

Among the Antemoro people, the production of paper embedded with flowers and other decorative natural materials is a long-established tradition that the community has begun to market to ecotourists. Embroidery and drawn thread work are done by hand to produce clothing, as well as tablecloths and other home textiles for sale in local crafts markets. Malagasy artists such as Madame Zo have incorporated textile traditions of Madagascar directly into their work. A small but growing number of fine art galleries in Antananarivo and several other urban areas offer paintings by local artists, and annual art events, such as the Hosotra open-air exhibition in the capital, contribute to the continuing development of fine arts in Madagascar.

=== Sport and recreational activities ===
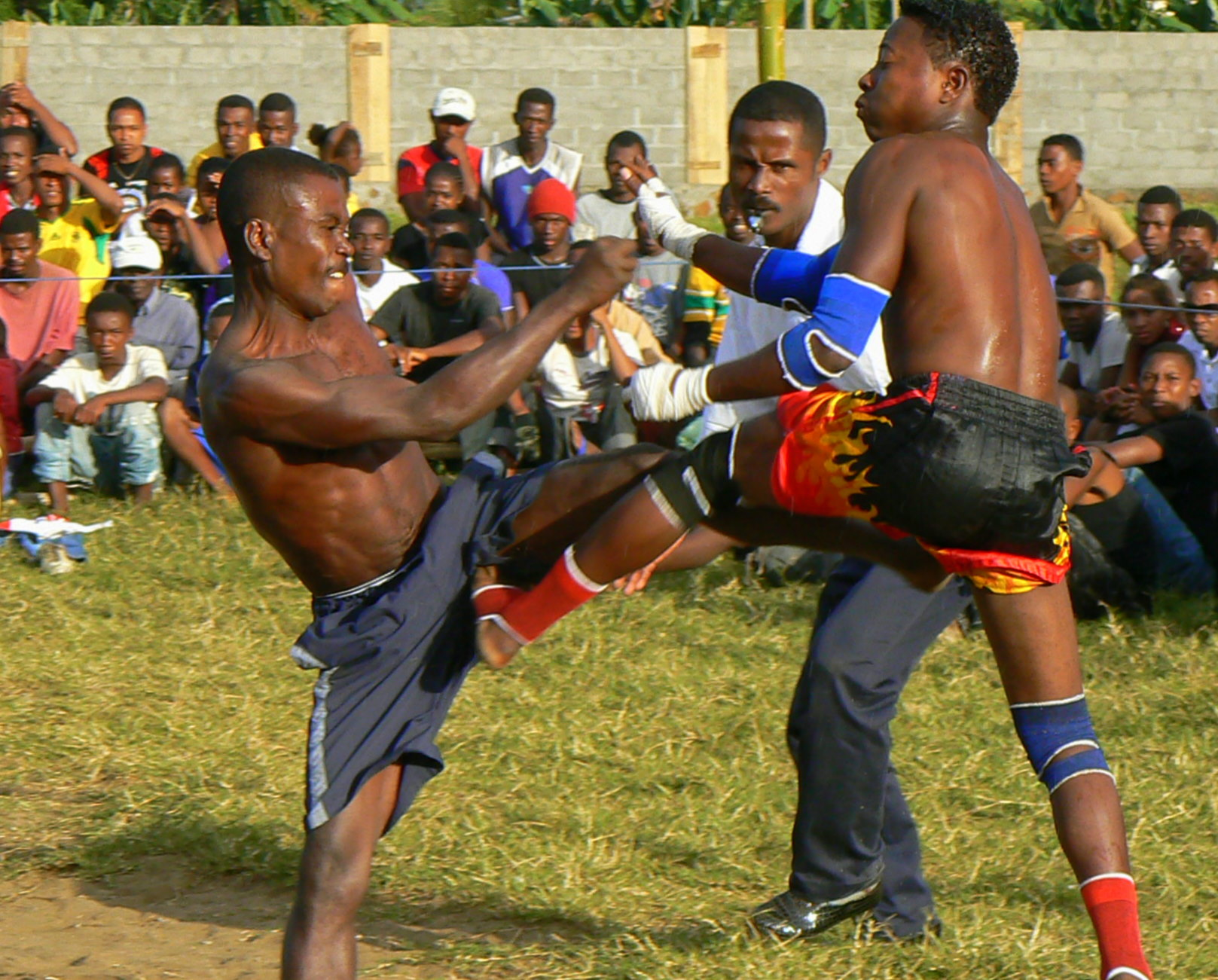
Moraingy is a traditional martial art of Madagascar.

A number of traditional pastimes have emerged in Madagascar. Moraingy, a type of hand-to-hand combat, is a popular spectator sport in coastal regions. Although it is traditionally practiced by men, women have recently begun to participate. Savika or tolon-omby, the wrestling of zebu cattle, is also practiced in many regions.

In addition to sports, a wide variety of games are played. Among the most emblematic is fanorona, a board game widespread throughout the Highland regions. According to folk legend, the succession of King Andrianjaka after his father Ralambo was partially the result of the obsession that Andrianjaka's older brother may have had with playing fanorona to the detriment of his other responsibilities.

Western recreational activities were introduced to Madagascar over the past two centuries. Rugby union is considered the national sport of Madagascar. Soccer is also popular. Madagascar has produced a world champion in pétanque, a French game similar to lawn bowling, which is widely played in urban areas and throughout the Highlands. School athletics programs typically include soccer, track and field, judo, boxing, women's basketball, and women's tennis. Madagascar sent its first competitors to the Olympic Games in 1964, and has also competed in the African Games. The IOC code for the country is MAD.

Scouting is represented in Madagascar by its own local federation consisting of three Scouting clubs. Membership in 2011 was estimated at 14,905.

Because of its advanced sports facilities, Antananarivo gained the hosting rights for several of Africa's top international basketball events, including the 2011 FIBA Africa Championship, the 2009 FIBA Africa Championship for Women, the 2013 FIBA Africa Under-16 Championship, the 2014 FIBA Africa Under-18 Championship, and the 2015 FIBA Africa Under-16 Championship for Women. At the 2019 African Games, Madagascar's national 3x3 basketball team won the gold medal.

=== Cuisine ===
Malagasy cuisine reflects the diverse influences of Southeast Asian, African, Oceania, Indian, Chinese, and European culinary traditions. The complexity of Malagasy meals can range from the simple traditional preparations introduced by the earliest settlers to the refined festival dishes prepared for the island's 19th-century monarchs.

Throughout almost the entire country, Madagascar's contemporary cuisine typically consists of a base of rice (vary) served with an accompaniment (laoka). The many varieties of laoka may be vegetarian or include animal proteins, typically featuring a sauce flavored with such ingredients as ginger, onion, garlic, tomato, vanilla, coconut milk, salt, curry powder, and green peppercorns, or less commonly, other spices or herbs. In parts of the arid south and west, pastoral families may replace rice with maize, cassava, or curds made from fermented zebu milk. A wide variety of sweet and savory fritters as well as other street foods are available across the island, as are diverse tropical and temperate-climate fruits.

Locally produced beverages include fruit juices, coffee, herbal teas, and alcoholic drinks such as rum, wine, and beer. Three Horses Beer is the most popular beer on the island and is considered emblematic of Madagascar.

== See also ==
- Outline of Madagascar

== Bibliography ==
- Acquier, Jean-Louis (1997). Architectures de Madagascar (in French). Berlin: Berger-Levrault. ISBN 978-2-7003-1169-3.
- Ade Ajayi, Jacob Festus (1989). General history of Africa: Africa in the nineteenth century until the 1880s. Paris: UNESCO. ISBN 978-0-520-03917-9. Archived from the original on 16 July 2020.
- Adelaar, Alexander (2006). "The Indonesian migrations to Madagascar: Making sense of the multidisciplinary evidence". In Simanjuntak, Truman; Pojoh, Ingrid; Harriet Eileen; Hisyam, Muhamad (eds.). Austronesian diaspora and the ethnogeneses of people in Indonesian archipelago. Jakarta, Indonesia: LIPI Press. ISBN 978-979-26-2436-6. Archived from the original on 15 July 2020.
- Ames, Glenn Joseph (2003). Distant lands and diverse cultures: the French experience in Asia, 1600–1700. New York: Greenwood Publishing Group. ISBN 978-0-313-30864-2.
- Auzias, Dominique; Labourdette, Jean-Paul (2007). Petit Futé: Madagascar 2008 (in French). Paris: Petit Futé. ISBN 978-2-7469-1982-2.
- Barendse, R. J. (2002). The Arabian seas: the Indian Ocean world of the seventeenth century. Berlin: M. E. Sharpe. ISBN 978-0-7656-0729-4. Archived from the original on 31 October 2015.
- Bradt, Hilary (2011). Madagascar (10th ed.). London: Bradt Travel Guides. ISBN 978-1-84162-341-2. Archived from the original on 16 February 2017.
- Browning, Christopher R. (2004). The Origins of the Final Solution. Jerusalem: Martyrs' and Heroes' Remembrance Authority. ISBN 978-3-540-63293-1. Archived from the original on 16 June 2016.
- Campbell, Gwyn (2005). An economic history of Imperial Madagascar, 1750–1895: the rise and fall of an island empire. London: Cambridge University Press. ISBN 978-0-521-83935-8. Archived from the original on 19 March 2013.
- Chapus, G. S.; Mondain, G. (1953). Un homme d'etat malgache: Rainilaiarivony (in French). Paris: Editions Diloutremer.
- Cousins, William Edward (1895). Madagascar of to-day: A sketch of the island, with chapters on its past history and present prospects. London: The Religious Tract Society.
- Curtin, Philip D. (1998). Disease and empire: the health of European troops in the conquest of Africa. Cambridge, MA: Cambridge University Press. ISBN 978-0-521-59835-4.
- Davies, S. J. J. F. (2003). "Birds I: Tinamous and Ratites to Hoatzins". In Hutchins, Michael (ed.). Grzimek's Animal Life Encyclopedia. Vol. 8 (2 ed.). Farmington Hills, MI: Gale Group. ISBN 978-0-7876-5784-0.
- Deschamps, Hubert Jules (1965). Histoire de Madagascar (in French). Ann Arbor, MI: Berger-Levrault.
- Ellis, William (1859). Three visits to Madagascar during the years 1853–1854–1856. London: Oxford University.
- Ellis, William (1867). Madagascar revisited, describing the events of a new reign and the revolution which followed. John Murray. LCCN 08033801.
- Ellis, William (1870). The martyr church: a narrative of the introduction, progress, and triumph of Christianity in Madagascar. J. Snow. LCCN 86159853.
- Emoff, Ron (2004). "Spitting into the wind: Multi-edged environmentalism in Malagasy song". In Dawe, Kevin (ed.). Island Musics. New York: Berg. ISBN 978-1-85973-703-3. Archived from the original on 15 July 2020.
- Fage, J. D.; Flint, J. E.; Oliver, R. A. (1986). The Cambridge History of Africa: From c. 1790 to c. 1870. London: Cambridge University Press. ISBN 978-0-521-20413-2. Archived from the original on 15 July 2020.
- Fournet-Guérin, Catherine (2007). Vivre à Tananarive: géographie du changement dans la capitale malgache (in French). Antananarivo, Madagascar: Karthala Editions. ISBN 978-2-84586-869-4. Archived from the original on 6 July 2020.
- Fox, Leonard (1990). Hainteny: the traditional poetry of Madagascar. Lewisburg, PA: Bucknell University Press. ISBN 978-0-8387-5175-6.
- Freeman, Joseph John; Johns, David (1840). A narrative of the persecution of the Christians in Madagascar: with details of the escape of six Christian refugees now in England. London: J. Snow.
- Frémigacci, Jean (1999). "Le Rova de Tananarive: Destruction d'un lieu saint ou constitution d'une référence identitaire?". In Chrétien, Jean-Pierre (ed.). Histoire d'Afrique (in French). Paris: Editions Karthala. ISBN 978-2-86537-904-0.
- Gallieni, Joseph-Simon (1908). Neuf ans à Madagascar (in French). Paris: Librairie Hachette.
- Heale, Jay; Abdul Latif, Zawiah (2008). Cultures of the World: Madagascar. Tarrytown, NY: Marshall Cavendish. ISBN 978-0-7614-3036-0. Archived from the original on 12 March 2021.
- Hillstrom, Kevin; Collier Hillstrom, Laurie (2003). Africa and the Middle East: a continental overview of environmental issues. Santa Barbara, CA: ABC-CLIO. ISBN 978-1-57607-688-0. Archived from the original on 15 July 2020.
- Hobbes, Joseph; Dolan, Andrew (2008). World Regional Geography. Belmont, CA: Cengage Learning. ISBN 978-0-495-38950-7. Archived from the original on 6 July 2020.
- Hodder, Ian (1982). Symbolic and structural archaeology. New York: Cambridge University Press. ISBN 978-0-521-24406-0. Archived from the original on 15 July 2020.
- Kennedy, David (2007). The Library of Congress World War II companion. New York: Simon and Schuster. ISBN 978-0-7432-5219-5.
- Kent, Raymond (1976). From Madagascar to the Malagasy Republic. Ann Arbor, MI: Greenwood Press. ISBN 978-0-8371-8421-0.
- Kitchen, Helen A. (1962). The Educated African: a Country-by-Country Survey of Educational Development in Africa. Washington, D.C.: Praeger.
- Kull, Christian (2004). Isle of Fire: The Political Ecology of Landscape Burning in Madagascar, Issue 246. Chicago: University of Chicago Press. ISBN 978-0-226-46141-0.
- Kusimba, Chapurukha; Odland, J. Claire; Bronson, Bennet (2004). Unwrapping the textile traditions of Madagascar. Textile Series. Los Angeles: Regents of the University of California. ISBN 978-0-930741-95-2.
- Lehoullier, Sara (2010). Madagascar: Travel Companion. New York: Other Places Publishing. ISBN 978-0-9822619-5-8.
- Middleton, Karen (1999). Ancestors, Power, and History in Madagascar. Los Angeles: Brill. ISBN 978-90-04-11289-6.
- Moriarty, H. A. (1891). Islands in the southern Indian Ocean, westward of longitude 80 ̊east, including Madagascar. London: J. D. Potter. Archived from the original on 29 September 2020.
- Nalla, Mahesh (2010). Crime and Punishment Around the World: Volume 1, Africa. Los Angeles: ABC-CLIO. ISBN 978-0-313-35133-4.
- Ogot, Bethwell (1992). Africa from the Sixteenth to the Eighteenth Century. Paris: UNESCO. ISBN 978-92-3-101711-7. Archived from the original on 15 July 2020.
- Oliver, Roland; Fage, John Donnelly; Sanderson, G. N. (1983). "The Cambridge History of Africa". Journal of Arid Environments. 6 (2). Cambridge, UK: Cambridge University Press: 195. Bibcode:1983JArEn...6..195S. doi:10.1016/S0140-1963(18)31535-0. ISBN 978-0-521-22803-9.
- Oliver, Samuel Pasfield (1886). Madagascar: an historical and descriptive account of the island and its former dependencies, Volume 1. London: Macmillan. Archived from the original on 26 July 2020.
- Pezzotta, Federico (2001). Madagascar: a mineral and gemstone paradise. Ann Arbor, MI: University of Michigan. ISBN 978-0-9715371-0-1.
- Pryor, Frederic L. (1990). The political economy of poverty, equity, and growth: Malawi and Madagascar. Washington, D.C.: World Bank. ISBN 978-0-19-520823-8. Archived from the original on 10 January 2020.
- Rabearivelo, Jean-Joseph (2007) [1936 (translation by Robert Ziller)]. Translated from the Night. Pittsburgh, PA: Lascaux Editions. ISBN 978-1-60461-552-4. Archived from the original on 15 July 2020.
- Rajaonarimanana, Narivelo (2001). Grammaire moderne de la langue malgache. Langues INALCO (in French). Paris: Langues et mondes – l'Asiatheque. ISBN 978-2-911053-79-5.
- Ralibera, Daniel (1993). Madagascar et le christianisme (in French). Paris: Editions Karthala. ISBN 978-92-9028-211-2. Archived from the original on 15 July 2020.
- Randier, Jean (2006). La Royale: L'histoire illustrée de la Marine nationale française (in French). Maîtres du Vent – La Falaise: Babouji. ISBN 978-2-35261-022-9.
- Randrianary, Victor (2001). Madagascar: les chants d'une île (in French). Paris: Actes Sud. ISBN 978-2-7427-3556-3.
- Ratsimbaharison, Adrien (2017). The Political Crisis of March 2009 in Madagascar: A Case Study of Conflict and Conflict Mediation. Lanham, Boulder, New York, London: Rowman & Littlefield. ISBN 978-1-4422-7235-4.
- Ratsimbazafy, Ernest (2010). "Moraingy". In Green, Thomas; Svinth, Joseph (eds.). Martial Arts of the World: An Encyclopedia of History and Innovation, Volume 2. Santa Barbara, CA: ABC CLIO. ISBN 978-1-59884-243-2. Archived from the original on 8 March 2017.
- Regnier, Denis (2015). "Clean people, unclean people: the essentialisation of 'slaves' among the southern Betsileo of Madagascar". Social Anthropology. 23 (2): 152–158. doi:10.1111/1469-8676.12107. Archived from the original on 25 October 2018.
- Reinsch, Paul Samuel (1905). Colonial Administration. New York: Macmillan.
- Rodd, Tony; Stackhouse, Jennifer (2008). Trees: A Visual Guide. Los Angeles: University of California Press. ISBN 978-0-520-25650-7. Archived from the original on 30 March 2021.
- Room, Adrian (2006). Placenames of the world: origins and meanings of the names for 6,600 countries, cities, territories, natural features, and historic sites. Jefferson, NC: McFarland. ISBN 978-0-7864-2248-7. Archived from the original on 29 March 2017.
- Sharp, Leslie (2002). The Sacrificed Generation: Youth, History, and the Colonized Mind in Madagascar. Berkeley, CA: University of California Press. ISBN 978-0-520-22951-8. Archived from the original on 14 July 2020.
- Shillington, Kevin (2005). Encyclopedia of African history. New York: CRC Press. ISBN 978-1-57958-453-5.
- Shinnie, P. L. (June 1983). "The Cambridge History of Africa". Journal of Arid Environments. 6 (2): 195–196. Bibcode:1983JArEn...6..195S. doi:10.1016/S0140-1963(18)31535-0.
- Strakes, Jason (2006). "Armed Forces of the People". In Leonard, Thomas M. (ed.). Encyclopedia of the developing world. Vol. 1. New York: Taylor & Francis. ISBN 978-1-57958-388-0. Archived from the original on 19 May 2015.
- Thompson, Virginia; Adloff, Richard (1965). The Malagasy Republic: Madagascar today. San Francisco, CA: Stanford University Press. ISBN 978-0-8047-0279-9.
- Uwechue, Raph (1981). Makers of modern Africa: profiles in history, Volume 1. Dearborne, MI: Africa Books Ltd. ISBN 978-0-903274-14-2.
- Wink, André (2004). Volume 3 of Al-Hind: The Making of the Indo-Islamic World: Indo-Islamic society, 14th–15th centuries. Leiden, The Netherlands: Brill. ISBN 978-90-04-13561-1. Archived from the original on 29 May 2016.
