= Sakalava empire =

Polity covering the west coast of Madagscar

Sakalava empire Fanjakana sakalava (Malagasy)
- c. 1600–1902
- Capital: Menabe: Mahabo (Morondava as principal port); Iboina: Tongay (1700-mid 18th c.); Marovoay (mid 18th c.-early 19th c.) (Majunga as principal port)
- Common languages: Northern Sakalava (Boina); Southern Sakalava (Menabe)
- Religion: Fomba Gasy
- Government: Absolute monarchies
- Mpanjaka be
  - late-16th/early-17th centuries: Andriamandazoala (Menabe, first)
  - 1897-1902: Ingereza (Menabe, last)
  - 1685-1710: Andriamandisoarivo (Iboina, first)
  - ?-1840: Tsiomeko (Iboina, last)
- History
  - Establishment of Menabe: c. 1600
  - Expansion north and founding of Iboina: late-17th century
  - Menabe nominally submit to Imerina: 1822
  - Imerina capture Majunga: 1824
  - Last Boina monarch renounces claims to the west coast: 1840
  - French conquest of Menabe: 1902
Succeeded by
Imerina; French Madagascar
- Today part of: Madagascar

The Sakalava empire was a polity along the western coast of Madagascar, consisting of two large Sakalava kingdoms (Menabe and Iboina) and various others ruled by members of the Maroserana dynasty. Characterised by scholars as either a confederation or (diffuse) empire, (Note: While many historians have categorised it as an empire, Solofo Randrianja considers that misleading since it implies centralised control by a metropole over different/foreign groups, and he says that Sakalava monarchs did not privilege their core's population but rather themselves.) the three broad divisions were Iboina (stretching from Ampasindava Bay in the north to the Namakia River in the south), Menabe (continuing down to the Mangoky River), and Fiherenana (ending at the Onilahy River near St. Augustine Bay), with Sakalava rule stretching anywhere between 50 and 200 km (31 and 124 mi) inland.

The Kingdom of Menabe was founded sometime before 1600 along the Morondava River. Maroserana rule grew following a succession dispute in Menabe which resulted in the expulsion of the king's brother, who expanded north to found Iboina. The details of how territory in the south was acquired are disputed. The king of Menabe re-established relations with his brother, and the Sakalava came to dominate trade. The empire expanded in part via the fatidra ceremony, which incorporated local rulers into the dynasty. In the 18th century Imerina's efforts to gain greater control over the island's trade posed a great threat to the Sakalava. Amid Britain and France's rivalrous competition to control Indian Ocean trade, Britain allied Imerina in 1817, forcing Sakalava to ally France. Imerina rapidly expanded throughout the 19th century, gaining nominal rule over Menabe and expelling the rulers of Iboina to surrounding islands. France invaded and defeated Imerina in the late-19th century, and after a 5-year-long war conquered Menabe in 1902, consolidating their rule over the island by 1904.

== History ==
=== Origins ===
A map showing Madagascar's rivers.

In Madagascar, the period from 1500 to 1800 saw the island's populations go from being mobile and unsettled to having organised largely into states. Sakalava tradition (Note: Called fitera, n'antoaniraza (customs), or lovan'tsofina (heritage of the ears), Sakalava oral traditions vary in content, especially when compared to Imerina's body of tradition (the Tantara ny Andriana), in part due to their time of collection in the mid-19th century when the empire had undergone disintegration, resulting in the absence of a single body of tradition.) holds that the ruling dynasty, the Maroserana, originated from overseas and migrated to southwest Madagascar. The proto-Sakalava are thought to have originated from Sadia (located at the mouth of the Manambolo River). Historian Solofo Randrianja considers the Maroserana to have lived in south-central Madagascar, while Raymond Kent thought they originated in the southwest and first came to power among the Mahafaly (supported by local traditions). (Note: Kent said that the theory of a south-eastern origin was derived from a now-defunct narrower theory proposing an Antesaka and Indian origin, however he noted (in 1970) that the general theory "has won acceptance among students of Madagacsar".) He also considered the Maroserana to have migrated and met the proto-Sakalava near the Mangoky River, who all traditions agree were skilled warriors. Together they arrived at the land between the Morondava and Tsiribihina rivers, noted for its good quality soil, which they named Menabe (meaning "very red"). Traditions detail how a kingdom was founded along the Morondava River before 1600, with early leaders holding ritual power through priests (ombiasy) and their protective amulets (ody, believed to be imbued with hasina), overtime developing into divine kingship.

Prior to the 17th century, Indian Ocean trade along the north-western coast of Madagascar was controlled by the Antalaotra, Muslim Swahili-speakers who had migrated to the region around the 10th century and intermarried with the locals. The south-west, predominantly inhabited by Zebu pastoralists, was excluded from this foreign trade prior to the arrival of Europeans (vazaha). In the mid-to-late 16th century, European merchants began using the newly-named St. Augustine Bay at the mouth of the Onilahy River as a stopping-point and traded with the communities there. Cattle and supplies were exchanged for beads and silver and the bay became a prominent trading port. Conflict over trade erupted along the Onilahy River in the 17th century, mostly in the form of cattle raids. On occasion the Andriana (ruling class) solicited direct or indirect military support from Europeans, who sought to protect trading alliances, further destabilising the region.

Further north, raiding from groups engaged with the north-western trade network likely spilled over into Sakalava territory, necessitating a strong military. In the late-16th or early-17th century, Andriamandazoala founded and centralised the state. (Note: Traditionally Andriamandazoala is held to have come from overseas. Other traditions say the founder was Andrianalimbe who came from the interior. Yet another strain of Sakalava tradition holds Rabaratavokoko as its founder. This name means "noble-bent-reed", while Andriamandazoala means "lord-who-withered-the-forest". Historian Raymond Kent interpreted these as implying Rabaratavokoko was a fitahina (a posthumous name deriving from a taboo around calling monarchs 'dead') for Andriamandazoala.) Andriamandazoala is said to have considered it his divine destiny to rule central-western Madagascar. His rule likely coincided with the increased cultivation of maize and manioc introduced from the Americas, and that of labour (possibly forced) on royal fields. It is plausible that a long-term high birth rate among the Maroserana royal family led to many princes without administrative positions, incentivising expansion. With his followers Andriamandazoala embarked on a series of conquests, as Sakalava rulers gave their subjects slaves and cattle gained. They also aimed to maintain good relations with original inhabitants (called tompontany, meaning "masters of the soil"), who rulers intermarried with and adopted their culture and religious beliefs. This saw Andriamandazoala extend his control in Menabe. A tradition collected in the 19th century held that a son of Andriamandazoala, Andriamisara, settled along the "Sakalava River" (Note: A 'Sakalava River' is known today as a tributary to the Mangoky River, however the collector of the tradition implied that it got its name from another river further north.) which he named his village after, and his followers are said to have adopted the name. Historians disagree about whether Andriamisara was part of the royal line, and Michael Lambek says that he was a diviner and advisor to the early monarchs. He is the most revered out of any figure in Sakalava history due to his purported role as the "architect of political order".

=== Further expansion ===
One of Andriamandazoala's nephews, Andriandahifotsy (r. from 1610 according to tradition), (Note: According to tradition Andriandahifotsy came to power after killing his uncle. His fitahina (posthumous name) was Andrianihananinarivo, meaning "lord-who-humbled-thousands".) ascended to the position. He is credited with expanding the kingdom beyond Menabe and monopolising trade along the west coast. Though initial encounters with Europeans were violent, Andriandahifotsy soon desired to attract their business and welcomed them. He established Morondava as a port city, and Mahabo inland as his capital, coming to control long-distance and coastal trade. His death caused a succession conflict between brothers. The initial succession system of primogeniture had broken down, possibly due to incest within the royal family. In 1683 Andriamanetriarivo succeeded in driving his brother/s out of the kingdom. One brother, Andriamandisoarivo, with his followers took this opportunity to expand north. During the conquests he deferred decisions to an ombiasy, and his forces raided for cattle and slaves which were then traded at conquered port cities. In 1685 Andriamandisoarivo reached Mazalagem Nova and killed the Antalaotra sultan. (Note: Andriamandisoarivo reportedly left Mazalagem Nova under the control of a group of Antalaotra merchants, headed by his baby granddaughter who was given as a wife to an Arab from Surat.) He established Tongay as his capital and Majunga as his main port, founding the Kingdom of Boina. He also sent soldiers to expand inland. The Sakalava are said to have respected those they conquered, and in the north rulers gradually incorporated Islamic elements into their institutions. After the conflict they aimed to avoid disrupting the Antalaotra trade, instead only taking tribute, and at Majunga Muslims practiced their religion freely. The influx of pirates expelled from the Caribbean in the late-17th century saw some given patronage by the Sakalava to assist in the control of trade, but they were driven out of the north by the British navy in the 1720s. Andriamandisoarivo died around 1710.

According to Raymond Kent, another brother (or possibly uncle) was Andriamandresy (also found in Antesaka tradition), who crossed to the east of the island across the Ihorombe Plateau (possibly to the Bara-Tanala gap), and his grandson, Berahava, established Nosipandra as the capital of the Antesaka kingdom. (Note: Jane Hooper and Jacques Lombard wrote that Andriamandresy was the son and successor of Andriamandazoala, and predecessor of Andriandahifotsy.) Jane Hooper lends credence to Drury's accounts, and says that an unnamed brother expanded southwards, intending to capture the key trading port of St. Augustine Bay. The Sakalava continued to expand southwards, ignoring the inhabitants' pleas for a meeting between leaders to end the conflict (traditionally called a kabary). Accordingly the brother established the port city of Toliara just north of the Bay. Peace was reportedly established by the early-18th century, and the ruler of Toliara held the title of "King Baba", functioning as a tributary who managed trade with the Europeans. Gwyn Campbell said that the southward expansion led to the founding of the "kingdom of Fiherenana". However Solofo Randrianja says that the kingdoms in the south were derived from the Maroserana's initial migration to the southwest. Kent and Hooper say that the local rulers of the Fiherenana Valley in the south (the Andrevola) were incorporated into the Maroserana dynasty via a 'blood brotherhood ceremony' called fatidra, which acted as a guarantee of safety and assistance from the monarch (done by the brother according to Hooper).

Hooper says that Andriamanetriarivo re-established relations with his brothers, reportedly in order to gain forgiveness from his now-deceased father. This alliance facilitated trade and defence. From this commercial dominance Sakalva kings had greater access to import firearms, and built strong militaries that could engage in slave raiding amid rising demand. Andriamanetriarivo further expanded, becoming so powerful that his subjects complained that his unchecked authoritarian rule superseded traditional institutions. Subjects were treated as slaves due to the abundance of royal work, and the king could dictate the halting of trade. Tales recount Andriamanetriarivo ordering executions while sitting under a tamarind tree. His reign is thought to have ended around 1712 and Sakalava tradition remembers him as a cruel man.

Successors of Andriamanetriarivo in Menabe struggled to control the expansive yet loosely-organised empire, and deaths of rulers continued to result in civil wars, which disrupted trade. In the north, the Sakalava of Boina sought to expand eastwards to gain control of trade routes in the interior, and therefore supply for trade. Iboina also looked to the ports of Vohemar and Irodo further north which enjoyed commercial relations with the eastern coast, whose communities traded slaves, rice, and amber gris. The Sakalava pressured states in the north and east to become tributaries, incorporating their rulers into the Maroserana dynasty via the fatidra ceremony. Boina king Toakafo is considered to have been the most powerful king in Madagascar during his reign, and by 1720 possibly controlled the entire northern third of the island.

=== Decline and Merina conquests ===
Following the failure of France's colony in Marotte/Nosy Mangabe (a small island off Antongil Bay purchased from the Sakalava Boina king (Note: It is unclear why the French assumed the Sakalava king owned the island.)), they began establishing trading posts along the east coast. Toakafo died c. 1733, and his successor, Ndramahatindriarivo, moved the capital to Marovoay. Hooper interprets the Sakalava to have raided Antongil Bay for rice to trade, causing starvation among the communities there. According to Hooper these attacks led to the formation of the Betsimisaraka Confederation to counter Sakalava aggression in the 1730s. Accordingly, after the Betsimisaraka defeated the Sakalava in Antongil Bay, they entered negotiations and formed an alliance, and the confederation's leader, Ratsimilaho, underwent the fatidra ceremony. However Stephen Ellis discussed reports from 1715 of a right-hand man to Toakafo called "Simialoe", who he considered to have been Ratsimilaho (Note: Ra- is a prefix.) and to have used this alliance to come to power. Ndramahatindriarivo's reign saw increased factionalism due to the many sons Toakafo had had, however Iboina after his death remained unified. Further east, the Betsimisaraka Confederation was subject to internal conflict and collapsed after Ratsimilaho's death in the 1750s, disrupting trade which the French harboured ambitions to control. The Sakalava were hostile to French attempts to set up trading posts on the northwest coast, and conflict between the two erupted in the 1770s, however after a few battles it ended inconclusively.

During the 17th century the Sakalava extracted tribute from the kingdoms in the interior's highlands; the 18th century saw the expansion and consolidation of the Merina Kingdom in the region, although in the late 18th century they were still a nominal vassal of Iboina. Imerina used ports' reliance on supply from the highlands to gain control over trade on the eastern coast. The period also saw rivalry between the French and the British over the wider Indian Ocean trade, of which Malagasy trade had proved decisive during the Carnatic Wars. Under Boina queen Ravahiny (r. 1778-1808) the west coast remained relatively peaceful and prosperous as the Sakalava made new alliances with Comorian and East African sultans. Some Sakalava began converting to Islam, possibly due to Omani influence. The supply of slaves from the highlands halted due to the conclusion of Imerina's consolidation, and they were instead imported from East Africa. The attacks of Imerina's Andrianampoinimerina (r. 1792-1810) against the Sakalava failed and did little to disrupt coastal trade, although sometimes resulted in an amiable peace. Following the death of Menabe's king in 1809 the succession conflict involved Imerina's Andrianampoinimerina. Battles were however inconclusive, and Sakalava's Ramitraho ascended to the position. The 19th century saw rapid growth of the slave trade and pressure from European commercial expansion, and in 1810 the British capitalised on French weaknesses to capture Mauritius off the east coast. The British allied with King Radama of Imerina in 1817 and recognised him as "King of Madagascar" with the stated aim of abolishing the slave trade, posing a great threat to Sakalava's dominance over trade, resulting in the Sakalava forming an alliance with the French..

After coming to rule Merina Radama began a wave of expansion, first east to Toamasina, then west against Menabe, and, after large failed attacks in 1820 and 1821, obtained Ramitraho's submission in 1822. Radama next campaigned to conquer numerous Sakalava ports from Iboina with support from the British navy. He captured Majunga from the recently-converted Muslim Boina king Andriantsouly in 1824, who had been weakened by friction between Muslim and traditionalist Sakalava elites. Radama outlawed any external trade that didn't pass through the port and Merina rule was repressive, causing Andriantsouly to flee to Zanzibar and many Sakalava and Antalaotra fled to the Comoro Islands, East Africa, and other parts of Madagascar. The lack of a supreme ruler in Iboina caused it to rapidly fragment and disintegrate. Radama continued his expansion, coming to claim control over the whole island, however his rule over Menabe was only nominal and they revolted in 1825.

=== French colonisation ===
After failing to obtain support from the Omani sultan and following Radama's death in 1828, Andriantsouly returned to the northwest, however failed to expel Merina's forces. In 1832 he was deposed in favour of his sister, and subsequently fled with his followers to Mayotte, seizing control of the island from its sultan. (Note: The French annexed the island in 1841 after Andriantsoly sold it to them for an annual pension..) Following regular revolts and resistance against Merina rule, Imerina's Ranavalona attacked Iboina in 1835, causing Sakalava leaders to flee to the surrounding small islands. In 1839, Boina queen Tsiomeko, having fled to the island of Nosy Be, requested French assistance against Merina attacks. In accordance with France's conditions, she signed Nosy Be and part of the mainland to them, which the French then declared as its protectorate. (Note: In response, Sakalava leaders abducted Tsiomeko's infant son and left for Analalava. The current non-sovereign monarch of this lineage (the Bemihisatra), still residing there, is Queen Zalifa Bente Salim.)

The French devised plans in 1842 and the 1860s to land troops in Madagascar and assist the Sakalava, who continued to resist, in a war against Imerina, however they didn't come to fruition. In the 1870s Imerina sent forces to crush rebellions among the Sakalava in Menabe, however the late 19th century still saw raids by the Sakalava into the highlands as Imerina's government weakened. In 1883 the French finally invaded, capitalising on Imerina's economic and political challenges, resulting in an ambiguous and interpretive treaty in 1885. The French invaded again in 1894, and in 1895 established a protectorate over the island. In 1897 France commenced a campaign to conquer Menabe, beginning with the massacre of King Toera and his chiefs who had convened at Ambiky and were about to lay down their arms, along with hundreds of others. In response to the massacre the Sakalava resisted tenaciously under Ingereza, however by 1902 Menabe's Sakalava had been defeated. (Note: Having been decapitated, in August 2025 France repatriated Toera's skull, previously held in the National Museum of Natural History, to Madagascar along with two others.) By 1904 France had consolidated their rule over Madagascar.

=== Postcolonial period ===
Many of the lineages continue to exist today as non-sovereign monarchies. The ancestral relics of the four 'founders' of Iboina (Note: Called efaday ("four men"), they are Adriandahifotsy, Andriamandisoarivo, Toakafo, and Andriamisara.) in Majunga are hotly contested over by the Bemihisatra and Bemazava lineages, who both split from the main dynastic line during Ndramahatindriarivo's reign in the 18th century. After a fire destroyed the shrine hosting the relics in 1958, the Bemazava built a new one called Mandresiarivo. On 8 June 1973 the Bemihisatra took the relics by force at night, and in 1979 the Bemazava's temple was bulldozed by a government official with Bemihisatra associations.

== Government ==
The states were headed by monarchs (Mpanjaka be, "great ruler") who ruled despotically, and adhered to patrilineal succession. The first minister (Manantany) handled the affairs of the state, and their degree of power was dependent on how involved the monarch became. An aide to the first minister (Fahatelo) served as the specialist on the clans, genealogies, and customs (the latter is said to have ruled Sakalava society). At the court was a Royal Council composed of six elders, and in some cases pirates who had sought safety in return for assistance in translations and negotiations. All decisions by the monarch were advised by priests (ombiasy), who could be held responsible if something went wrong. (Note: Some ombiasy are known to have been executed in disgrace.) Taxation was usually in the form of cattle, and people fulfilled labour quotas by working on royal rice fields, with their position and ability determining the amount. This was overseen by an official also titled Fahatelo, who also saw the royal cattle pen was maintained via gifts. Relatives of the monarch became minor rulers (mpanjaka) over small polities (fehitra), fulfilling their economic needs but limiting their political influence. Tributaries paid in the form of silk, rice, sheep, vegetables, and likely slaves.

== Economy ==
The Sakalava were predominantly pastoral, although they cultivated manioc and maize as insurance in cases of drought and natural disaster.

=== Trade ===
Sakalava monarchs aimed to exclude other groups from foreign trade, and only engaged on their own terms. The monarch's diviner typically decided when foreign trade began, and traders dealt with the monarch first, followed by his subjects. European traders included Dutch, French, Portuguese, English, English-Americans, and Danes. The convention when trading slaves was for Sakalava monarchs to share the alcohol the Europeans had gifted while they underwent price negotiations, which turned into heavy drinking sessions. The Europeans traded out of necessity in order to survive, trading firearms, coins, and manufactured goods for food and slaves. Due to rice cultivation being unsuitable to the dry environment of the west coast, the Sakalava obtained most of their rice from the interior.

== Culture and society ==
The monarchs were supported by a cult based on ancient relics called dady, (Note: Said to have been started by Andriamisara.) which were considered proof of royalty and a source of power due to their associations with the royal ancestors (Ampagnitobe). A periodical ritual based on them involved publicly washing the bones of deceased monarchs in a river, and it was overseen by officials titled Talempihitry and Haminboay. The politico-religious concept of hasina represented the "essence of power and fertility", believed to usually be given by ancestors and to accrue in humans, facilitating political authority and hierarchy. In royal praise poems (antsa maventy, meaning "great songs"), common themes include the notion that all wealth would rightly concentrate in the monarch, and that people are obligated to serve the monarchy akin to slaves. Service to royalty, both living and ancestral, involved labour, tribute, and ceremonies. Firearms were rarely used in warfare, but rather for ceremonial uses, such as to announce the monarch's arrival or death. Royal tombs (doany) were built in sacred places to house ancestral relics. Deceased monarchs were given posthumous names (called fitahina), due to a taboo about referring to monarchs as 'dead'. The formula for the names used andria- or ndram- (meaning "lord" or "noble") and -arivo (meaning "thousand[s]"), indicating that a monarch was expected to have many subjects. Female spirit mediums were believed to be inhabited by the spirits of deceased monarchs (tromba) who then addressed the public, empathising with and voicing them in creative performances.

First inhabitants of conquered lands were called tompontany, meaning "masters of the soil/land", based on the belief (primarily among agriculturalists) in land being sacred and belonging to the deities, and in the first inhabitants having good relations with them. The same was true for tompondrano ("masters of the water") for rivers and lakes. Finn Fuglestad and Jacques Lombard consider monarchs to have presented themselves (the Maroserana) as descendants of the supreme deity Ndranan Ahary in order to seize ritual power from the tompontany, as they became 'mediators' between Ndranan Ahary, the royal ancestors, and the population. Gradually the concept and roles of tompontany were subsumed, however tompondrano mostly retained their positions, possibly because they were smaller and relatively marginal.

Meals often consisted of maize, manioc, calavances, and milk. Women were important for ensuring the growth of the patrilineal kinships and large lineages correlated to political power. (Note: The word firenena, meaning "lineage" or "uniting of clans/nation", is derived from the word for "mother" (reny).) Territorial endogamy was encouraged to such an extent that celibacy was preferable to alternatives. If celibate, women cared for children entrusted to their maternal uncles (renilahy, meaning "masculine mothers"), who were in charge of the circumcision initiation rite into the paternal lineage. Under Queen Ravahiny (r. 1778-1808) poison trials using tanguin were carried out to determine guilt for crimes.

=== Philosophy ===
In Sakalava thought, history is suffering and something heavy to be borne, as evidenced by numerous etymologies and the tromba institution. Canadian anthropologist Michael Lambek distinguishes it from North American conceptions, saying "Sakalava do not commemorate past trauma in order to paint themselves as victims or acquire rights on that account. They want to be understood as powerful. But the Sakalava notion of power is characterized by the way it turns inward; potency is understood in a way that highlights silence, sacrifice, and constraint, but also connection to the wider order rather than individual rights or autonomy from order."

== List of rulers ==
=== Menabe ===
The following is a list of rulers of Menabe according to Jacques Lombard (fitahina in small print):

- Andriamandazoala
- Akobo Andriamandresiarivo
- Andriandahifotsy Andrianihaninarivo
- Ratrimolahy Andriamanetriarivo
- Ramiteny Andriamanotriarivo
- Ramienala Andriantsoanarivo
- Ramitraha Andriamatantiarivo
- Rekalasambae Andrianilainarivo
- Vinany Andriantahoranarivo
- Toera Andriamilafikarivo (brother of Iangereza Andriamanengarivo)

=== Iboina ===
The following is a list of rulers of Iboina according to Michael Lambek, complemented by Jacques Lombard:

- Tsimanato Andriamandisoarivo (r. 1685-1710)
- Andriantoakafo Andramboeniarivo (r. 1710-33)
- Andriamahatindriarivo (r. 1733-?)
- Andrianjahevenarivo
- ... (two queens preceded Ravahiny)
- Ravahiny Ndramamelong (r. 1785-1819)
- Tsimalama (r. 1819-22)
- Andriantsoly Ndramanavakarivo (r. 1822-32, last official sovereign)
- Oantitsy
- Tsiomeko (d. 1842)
