= Vazimba =

First inhabitants of Madagascar

Artist's interpretation of 16th century Vazimba village in highland Madagascar (1978)

The Vazimba (Malagasy [vaˈʒimbə̥]), according to popular belief, were the first inhabitants of Madagascar. While beliefs about the physical appearance of the Vazimba reflect regional variation, they are generally described as smaller in stature than the average person, leading some scientists to speculate that they may have been a pygmy people (and therefore a separate Malagasy ethnic group) who migrated from the islands that constitute modern-day Indonesia and settled in Madagascar over the course of the period between 350 BCE–500 CE. Scientific evidence confirms the first arrival and subsequent increase of human settlers on the island during this period, but the pygmy theory has not been proven.

Stories about the Vazimba form a significant element in the cultural history and collective identity of the Malagasy people, ranging from the historical to the supernatural, inspiring diverse beliefs and practices across the island. They have analogs in some other Austronesian cultures, including the Menehunes in Hawaii.

== History ==
=== First settlers of Madagascar ===
The facts surrounding the initial settling of Madagascar by oceanic explorers from the region of modern-day Indonesia, including the precise timing and nature of this colonization, remain a subject of ongoing debate and study. It has been theorized that there may have been successive waves of early settlement in Madagascar. According to this theory, the waves originated from the same region of southeast Asia, spoke the same language and shared the same culture. When the second wave arrived, they found the island sparsely populated by descendants of the first wave whose culture and way of life had evolved from the first settlers way of life, reflecting centuries of adaptation to local surroundings in total isolation from outside threats. According to popular belief, the Vazimba did not possess knowledge of metallurgy or rice farming and used weapons made of clay. After Bantu-speaking settlers from East Africa migrated to the island and brought their culture of zebu cattle herding with them, the Vazimba were said to have herded their zebu without eating them for meat. If the multi-wave settlement theory is correct, the indigenous (first-wave) population that the more technologically advanced second-wave settlers would have encountered upon arrival in Madagascar would provide the historic basis for stories of the primitive nature of the Vazimba societies they are said to have encountered there.

Archaeological research and oral histories have provided some indication of how these early inhabitants of the highlands might have lived. Upon their arrival in those ancient tropical highland forests, the Vazimba practiced tavy (swidden, slash-and-burn agriculture) to clear the land for cultivating bananas, tubers, ginger and other staples. They gathered honey, fruits and edible seeds and hunted small game in the forests. As their population increased, villages were established and ruled by chiefs and later kings. Rulers are believed to have reddened their hair using a local mushroom; the association of the color red with royalty is found in many parts of Madagascar to this day.

According to Manasse Esoavelomandroso writing in the General History of Africa: Volume 9 (2025), the first settlers and tompontany, were the Kimosy south-central, the Antevinany in the southeast, the Antankoala and Kajemby in the northwest, and the Rasikajy in the northeast. He says that by the 8th century, the Vazimba had absorbed or violently displaced the first settlers, and had come to refer to themselves as tompontany. Solofo Randrianja describes the Vazimba as a 'way of life' rather than an ethnic group.

Oral history classifies the Vazimba according to the parts of the island where they are believed to have settled. The vazimba andrano ("Vazimba of the Water") settled along rivers and lakes. The vazimba antety ("Vazimba of the Soil") were believed to be the most numerous and were reportedly clustered around the valley of Betsiriry in the central Highlands. The vazimba antsingy ("Vazimba of the Tsingy") lived in the caves around the limestone formations (tsingy) of Bemaraha in western Madagascar and were believed to scavenge fruit and other forest products to live.

=== Historic rise and decline ===
The first period of Malagasy oral history is known as the Vazimba period (faha vazimba), beginning with the initial population of the island by the Vazimba and their establishment of kingdoms – often ruled by Queens – in the central Highlands region of Madagascar. According to some accounts, the first Vazimba sovereign of the central highlands was named Andriandravindravina. The second period in the oral history of the Highlands begins with the conquest of the Vazimba Highland kingdoms by Merina sovereigns in what would come to be known as Imerina in their honor. Andriamanelo (1540–1575) – who was himself half-Vazimba through his antecedents Queen Rangita and Queen Rafohy – is credited (along with his successors, Ralambo and Andrianjaka) with successfully forcing the Vazimba out of the Highlands and into the western part of the island. Traditions attribute the conquest of the Vazimba to the need to acquire more land for rice cultivation, with archaeological research putting the beginning of this expansion in the 14th century.

It is commonly believed that the last of the Vazimba were annihilated during the reign of Andrianjaka (1610–1630). However, dismissing the stories of distinctive Vazimba physical appearance, Jean-Pierre Domenichini has theorized that the term Vazimba may have been more of a statement of cultural than ethnic difference and that many who had been considered Vazimba in this period did not die out, but instead may have simply chosen to become assimilated into the vanquishing Merina culture. J. C. Hebert considered the Merina to have established joking relationships with the 'masters of the soil', the Vazimba, as an alliance, based on the similarities between Vazimba and ziva. The oral history of many Merina and Betsileo families speaks of intermarriage between Merina and Vazimba ancestors, and some Malagasy speculate that the hunter-gatherer Mikea peoples and the Vezo fishing tribe, both concentrated along the coastline of western and southern Madagascar, may be descended from Vazimba.

== In the popular imagination ==
There are many legends and stories in Malagasy oral history relating to important Vazimba figures. For instance, oral history tells of a Vazimba woman named Ramboamana and a Vazimba man named Ramboabesofy, known as tompon-tany (masters of the land) – the earliest inhabitants of Madagascar, who settled in the region of Ankavandra. The couple had two sons named Rangoromana and Zafihisoky whom legend credits as the first to bring zebu to the island. Some Merina trace their genealogy back to a man named Ndrenavoavo or his sister Pelamana who, according to oral history, were the very first non-Vazimba people (i.e. second-wave settlers) to arrive in Madagascar. They are believed to be buried in a forest near Tsirendresaka. It is said that their tomb was venerated by all the Vazimba of Betsiriry, and in return, the people of Tsirendresaka observe a fady (taboo) that forbids the killing of zebu, in homage to the Vazimba and their tradition of herding cattle without consuming them.

In Madagascar today, popular belief maintains that the Vazimba may not have been human at all, but rather a sort of monster or often malevolent spirit that haunts natural sites such as rivers, boulders or gorges. Oral history maintains that it was customary among Vazimba to submerge their dead in designated bogs or other waters and these areas are held sacred, sometimes becoming sites of pilgrimage and sacrifice. The Vazimba are often envisioned as being smaller than the average person, either quite pale or very dark. The more monstrous descriptions of Vazimba speak of an unnaturally elongated face with large lips concealing fang-like teeth. Among the many beliefs related to the Vazimba, it is said they cannot stand to touch any object that has made contact with salt, and it is forbidden to bring garlic or pork into an area believed to contain a Vazimba tomb.

== See also ==
- Mikea
- Beosi
- Little people (mythology)
- Kalanoro
- Tiki
