= Kalanoro =

Humanoid cryptid of Madagascar

Creature information
- Grouping: Cryptid
- Similar entities: Sylvanus
- Folklore: Folklore

Origin
- Country: Madagascar
- Region: Andoboara Cave

The Kalanoro are alleged cryptid humanoids described in the folklore of Madagascar. Believed to live as spirits, tradition asserts that they used to live corporeally in the rainforests; however, their physical forms were said to have gone extinct due to habitat destruction.

The Kalanoro are described as small, hairy humanoids with fangs. Their legs are said to be oriented backwards, with likewise backward-facing feet; further, their eyes are claimed to glow red. Their hair and fingernails are both long and unkempt. Living solitary lifestyles, they reportedly eat raw meat, and have a "whining voice" that scares dogs.

Stories of the Kalanoro and their motivations vary. They have been portrayed as malevolent spirits who rob, kill people, and abduct children. The Kalanoro in recent times have also been associated with alcoholism; however, they are also seen as loyal servants to their human companions and can take a paternalistic interest in humans. One Sakalava tale describes a Kalanoro kidnapping children, but only due to their perceiving mistreatment by the children's parents. Once the Kalanoro's demands were met, the abducted children were returned.

As a subject of cryptozoology, they were discussed in an episode of Destination Truth.

== Kalanoro in religious and contemporary practice ==
The Kalanoro are said to act as spirit servants to the living. They reportedly steal as well as act in the role of clairvoyants for their human companions, who can also draw on them for healing. If a person wishes to purchase the services of a Kalanoro, they traditionally visit the "owner's" establishment at night, and only interact with them through a wall or closed door. It is said that when the human's voice reaches a high-pitched register and a nasal timbre, the Kalanoro is speaking through them. The Kalanoro are also said to impart taboos to people via their dreams or by means of visions.

It has also been suggested that the Vazimba are the ghosts of the Kalanoro.

== See also ==
- Vazimba
