= Beosi =

Short-statured hunter-gatherers of the central highlands of Madagascar

Regions with significant populations
- Madagascar

Languages
- Malagasy

Related ethnic groups
- other Malagasy peoples, not necessarily close to the Mikea

The Beosi are short-statured hunter-gatherers of the central highlands of Madagascar. They are distinct from the Mikea hunter-gatherers and horticulturalists of the lowlands.

== Language ==
Beosi
- Native to: Madagascar
- Ethnicity: Beosi
- Language family: Austronesian: Malayo-Polynesian; Western Indonesian; Barito; East Barito; Malagasy; Beosi

Language codes
- ISO 639-3: None (mis)
- Glottolog: vezo1235

The Beosi speak a dialect of the Malagasy language, which originated in southern Borneo. Speculation that there may be remnants of a Vazimba language in Beosi speech was investigated by Blench & Walsh (2009). Beosi speech was found to have a relatively high proportion of vocabulary that cannot be identified with words in other varieties of Malagasy, substantially more than the Mikea dialect, and is more likely than Mikea to retain a Vazimba substrate, if such a thing even exists. The possibility is complicated by the extensive use of evasive language and cant by the Beosi, which is designed to hinder understanding by outsiders.
