= Lambek (disambiguation) =

Lambek may refer to:

- Joachim Lambek (1922–2014), professor of pure mathematics at McGill University.
- Lambek–Moser theorem, a combinatorial number theory.
- Michael Lambek (born 1950), professor of anthropology at the University of Toronto Scarborough.
