= Fitampoha =

Traditional ceremony of the Sakalava people

Fitampoha is a traditional ceremony of the Sakalava people of Madagascar, taking place every five years at Belo-sur-Tsiribihina. The main ritual of Fitampoha consists in bathing the relics, called dady, of the ancient Sakalava kings in the waters of the Tsiribihina River, once part of the Sakalava kingdom of Menabe. The most venerated of the ancient kings is Andriamisara I, who is considered the common ancestor of both the main Sakalava dynasties, that of Menabe and that of Boina.
