= Mikea people =

Malagasy-speaking hunter-gathers in Madagascar

Mikea
Total population
- c. 1,500

Regions with significant populations
- Madagascar

Languages
- Mikea

Religion
- African Traditional Religion

Related ethnic groups
- Bantu peoples, Austronesian peoples, other Malagasy people

The Mikea are a group of Malagasy-speaking horticulturalists and foragers who are often described as the lowland hunter-gatherers of Madagascar. They inhabit the Mikea Forest, a patch of mixed spiny forest and dry deciduous forest along the coast of southwestern Madagascar. The Mikea are predominantly of Sakalava origin, although the term describes a shared way of life rather than an ethnic group per se, and individuals from a variety of Malagasy ethnic groups are found among the Mikea. The family encampments of the Mikea shift from prime corn planting territory at the edge of the forest in the rainy season to the interior forest rich with tenrecs and other game in the dry season, when the community becomes highly dependent on spongy tubers to meet their daily demand for water. Their lifestyle is interdependent with that of their neighboring Vezo fishermen and the Masikoro farmers and herders, with whom they trade products caught, foraged or cultivated in the forest. Many Mikea also occasionally engage in paid work such as guarding the zebu herds or tending the corn fields of others.

The present-day Mikea are not a remnant of an ancient Malagasy hunter-gatherer society, but are instead descendants of individuals who took refuge in the forest beginning in the 1800s to escape military conflict, heavy taxation and other oppressive factors. Their way of life is perceived by villagers and city dwellers alike as ancestral, contributing to a mystique about them that has inspired various myths and legends. They are commonly believed to be the mythical Vazimba, the original inhabitants of the island, although there is no evidence to support this view. They are distinct from the Beosi hunter-gatherers of the highlands. While some 1,500 individuals are known to identify as Mikea, many Malagasy disbelieve that the community continues to exist in the present day.

== Ethnic identity ==
The Mikea are hunter-gatherers (also called foragers) who practice limited farming. The Mikea label is applied to those who live this subsistence lifestyle rather than being tied to a specific ethnicity. There are numerous groups termed Mikea along the west and southwest coast of Madagascar, with the majority living in and around the spiny Mikea Forest on the southwestern coast between Morombe and Toliara, an area extending 2500 square kilometers. Historically this main concentration of Mikea may have extended as far south as the Fiherenana River and as far north as the Mangoky River; another main cluster of Mikea live to the west and southwest of Lake Ihotry. They are typically considered a subset of the Sakalava ethnic group, although there are Mikea individuals who trace their origins to other ethnic groups. Their adherence to a way of life perceived by villagers and city dwellers as ancestral has contributed to a mystique and various myths and legends about them, and many Malagasy believe they are the descendants of Vazimba, the original inhabitants of the island, although there is no evidence to support this view. The majority of Malagasy believe the existence of the Mikea to be a myth and are unaware that any Malagasy continue to live the Mikea lifestyle to the present day. The term Mikea is principally used by outsiders to label this group and is not often used by members of this community themselves. Most Mikea prefer to call themselves either Vezo-Mikea or Masikoro-Mikea, depending on their specific family lineages.

== History ==
The majority of the Mikea live in the Mikea Forest between Toliara and Morombe.

The Mikea are not remnants of an early hunter-gatherer society. Although researchers remain uncertain when the Mikea first adopted a forest-dwelling, hunter-gatherer lifestyle, they have determined that the Mikea were only recently established as a community. The current Mikea population is believed to be descended largely from Masikoro villagers who fled into the forest to escape advancing Merina and Sakalava armies in the 18th and 19th centuries. Colonial French documents dating to 1901 describe hunter gatherers by the name of Mikea living in the southwest of the island. The population is believed to have swelled during the 1947 uprising against French colonial rule, when many Malagasy families left towns and villages to hide in forests across the country. Oil exploration in the 1950s and 1960s entailed cutting paths through the formerly untouched forests of the southwest, which further contributed to the migration of villagers into the forest to adopt the Mikea lifestyle.

== Society ==
Mikea are subject to national laws like all Malagasy citizens but in practice national laws, government and social services do not reach this population while dwelling in the forest. Within Mikea forest encampments an egalitarian form of self-government predominates, with the eldest male family member having the main decision-making authority for the group. This is in contrast to certain ethnic groups, such as the Merina, who had a complex form of social organization that overlaid a caste system with specific social roles assigned to particular family groups. In 1991, an estimated 1,500 Malagasy were living the Mikea lifestyle, primarily around the Mikea Forest, an area that receives limited rainfall. This number was estimated at several hundred in the 1950s, suggesting a growth in population. The true number of people living from forest scavenging is difficult to estimate with accuracy, as the label "Mikea" is very flexible, and the degree of reliance on scavenging as opposed to seasonal farming can vary significantly at any given time depending on economic and environmental conditions. The Mikea are subject to social stigma linked to their image as primitive or uncivilized people.

Housing and social organization among the Mikea can vary from one individual or community to the next. Some Mikea remain in the forest their entire lives, while others live part of their lives in villages or towns. While living in the forest, groups of Mikea typically move seasonally between encampments nearest to critical resources. In the rainy season, they often live in groups of 30-50 people near tracts of virgin forest in proximity to their newly cleared and planted corn fields. The houses in this settlement are square with peaked roofs, as elsewhere in Madagascar, and are typically made of thatch and bark on a wooden pole frame. These houses are loosely clustered with generous space between each lodging. The rainy season encampment serves for three to five years as a base for forest foraging before resource depletion requires a move to a new location. Those working the corn fields may live in simple grass shelters alongside their crops until April or May, when they return to the bark houses. During the dry season from May to October, the encampment splits into smaller groups that relocate deeper into the forest to settle near babo tuber patches, with dwellings limited to brush shelters and thatch sunshades, and some individuals not living in shelters at all. In both types of settlements furniture is nearly non-existent and Mikea typically sleep in the sand or pits dug at the base of giant termite mounds.

The Mikea struggle to ensure the quality of life they seek. While the forest has long provided for their basic needs, deforestation and population growth are straining resources. In addition, Mikea are increasingly seeking to obtain better quality material goods for themselves, such as clothing, which necessitates greater engagement with the external economy through trade and wage labor to earn local currency. Lack of access to social services such as education and health clinics are also taking their toll: with only one health clinic in the Mikea Forest area and low access to water for bathing, rates of diseases such as tuberculosis, leprosy and skin disease are disproportionately prevalent.

=== Family affiliation ===
Mikea tend to trace their lineage back to specific villages within one or more of three main lineages, associated respectively with the northern, southern and central parts of the Mikea Forest. Most also have relatives living in Vezo and/or Masikoro villages in the region. Many Mikea families have established ziva (a "joking relationship", commonly found in southern and eastern Africa) with the Vohitse Vanovato clan of the Masikoro, which indicates a degree of familial closeness with this subclan.

Mikea encampments are typically family groups. These consist of an elder couple, their married sons and daughters-in-law, the grandchildren of these marriages, and the elder couple's own unmarried children of any age. Adult daughters typically move to join their husband's family encampment upon marriage, but married couples often share their time between the husband's or wife's parents' encampments. Family unions are formed through a fandeo ceremony in which the man is presented to his intended bride's family, and the acceptance of her parents legitimizes the union. Children of the marriage are legitimized by the husband's bestowal of presents to his wife's parents. The relationship between the wife's brother (renilahy, "male mother") and her children can be very strong in Mikea marriages, and the renilahy will commonly adopt children that his sister's husband does not legitimize. Both the husband and the wife have the right to divorce at any time and remarry. Polygamy is also practiced.

=== Religious affiliation ===
Like other Malagasy, the Mikea spiritual belief system revolves around respect for ancestors. They also share the common Malagasy belief in a creator god, termed Andrianajanahary. Many Mikea believe in various types of forest spirits (koko), which are associated with certain natural spots in the forest deemed sacred; these sites serve as the focus of various ceremonies, in which rum has spiritual and symbolic significance. The greatest of the nature spirits is Ndrianazo, the lord of the forest. The extended family group, which spreads through multiple encampments, is united around a central priest figure, the mpitoka hazomanga, who officiates over major family ceremonies dedicated to the ancestors. In addition, within each encampment is at least one ombiasy (wiseman) who interprets the will of the ancestors and spirits, and plays important roles in such ceremonies as marriage, circumcision, blessings, ancestral rituals, funerals, and tromba and bilo spirit possession ceremonies. Some also practice sikidy and other forms of divination, and provide spiritual advice on the best days or places to hunt, plant, shift camp, and other such events of daily life.

== Culture ==
The Mikea are culturally and linguistically nearly identical to the neighboring Vezo fishing clan and Masikoro herding and farming clan of the Sakalava; only the traditional source of livelihood distinguishes the three groups. The popular association of the Mikea with the ancestral Vazimba clan has contributed to widespread belief that the Mikea possess Vazimba attributes, such as being small in stature, unclothed, shy and avoidant of contact with outsiders, and living in perfect harmony with the natural environment. None of these are borne out by evidence.

The Mikea are known to make masks – a rarity in Madagascar – using human teeth and hair.

=== Dance and music ===
Music is a significant part of Mikea social and spiritual life. Specific songs are associated with a wide range of life events and ceremonies, including havoaza (funerals), bilo (magical healing rituals), tromba (spirit possession), ringa (martial arts matches), savatsy (circumcision ceremonies) and more. Most music is vocal - often making use of whistling, shouts and other vocal effects in addition to singing - with percussion accompaniment ranging from handclapping to djembe or langoro drums. Conch shells and the jejy lava (stringed instrument with a gourd resonator, played with a bow) are also performed; both of these ancient instruments are increasingly rare in Madagascar and among the Mikea the latter is performed by men for one another. Rarer and more costly instruments like the marovany wooden box zither and the valiha bamboo tube zither are used for certain sacred rituals that invoke the ancestors. The marovany or valiha player is typically paid a fomba monetary tribute to perform the ceremonial music. Many songs are accompanied by specific dances and rituals that continue to be practiced among the Mikea in daily life.

== Language ==
The Mikea speak a dialect of the Malagasy language, which originated in southern Borneo. Their dialect is close to that spoken by the Vezo fishing clan and Masikoro herding clan of the Sakalava people.

Speculation that there may be remnants of a Vazimba language in Mikea speech was investigated by Blench & Walsh (2009) and found wanting. They concluded,

"[The] data is so exiguous and so scattered, that it is unlikely to constitute a significant record of a substrate vocabulary, as opposed to a set of idiosyncratic words, not untypical for a population of former foragers."

The speech of the Beosi people, short-statured hunter-gatherers of the highlands, has a higher proportion of unidentifiable vocabulary.

== Economy ==
The arid conditions of the spiny forest, which receives less than 600 millimeters of rainfall each year, largely shape Mikea economic activities. Nearly everything they consume is scavenged from the forest, and the average Mikea needs two hours or less to collect adequate food for the day. Their main source of food is tubers, particularly during the dry season when few other foods may be reliably available. Adults and children of both genders work to dig up using a metal-tipped digging stick (antsoro) and a digging bowl (kipao). The starchy ovy tuber is roasted or boiled before eating, while the Mikea eat the watery babo (or baboho) raw for hydration or use its water for boiling other foods; the tavolo tuber is dried and ground to make a flour that is sold at village markets. They also gather forest fruits, melons and honey, with the latter a particularly important source of income for the Mikea during the rainy season. To obtain water during the rainy season the Mikea capture rain run-off from the rooftops of their houses using hollowed-out logs or transport water on foot or zebu-drawn wagon from the villages, while during the cool dry season the Mikea consume their store of water-engorged babo tubers and drink water from natural or man-made wells when possible.

Key protein sources include birds and tenrecs. Mikea adults and children of both sexes use clubs to kill the small tenrec (tambotrika, 0.4 kilograms), which is widespread year round, and the larger one (tandraka, 2-3 kilograms), which is mainly caught during the rainy season. To a lesser extent they also hunt or trap two to three species of lemur, feral cats, occasional wild boars, turtles and rodents using blowguns, spears and dogs, and use a hook and line to catch fish in saline inland lakes. Some Mikea raise animals such as goats, chickens and guineafowls for food or sale at market; tree nuts also provide additional protein.

The principal crop of the Mikea is corn, which was introduced to Madagascar in the 1890s. They also occasionally grow manioc. The dry season is used to cut new corn fields, which are burned in October (swidden agriculture, locally termed hatsaky) and planted in November and December as the rains begin to fall. This corn is harvested three months later and consumed during the wet season; surplus is dried and sold, with some saved for the following year's planting and consumption. The traders who gather the maize from the Mikea process it for international export at a significant profit.

The Mikea live in a symbiotic relationship with the neighboring Masikoro farmers and herders, and the Vezo fishing clan. The Mikea live primarily on food scavenged from the forest but also grow seasonal crops. Their mobility and reliance on scavenging as opposed to crop growing shifts in response to changes in environmental and economic pressures on availability of resources within the Mikea community as well as those of their Vezo and Masikoro neighbors. The Mikea sell their forest products, as well as woven mats and food animals they raise, at weekly Vezo and Masikoro markets in nearby villages to obtain the necessities they cannot scavenge, such as clothing and medicine. Some Mikea migrate for periods of time to work in local villages or the town of Morombe. They are also hired to work for Vezo and Masikoro villagers, such as by cutting forest for villagers or other Mikeas' corn fields, or guarding villagers' zebu herds. They occasionally acquire one or more zebu in addition to or in lieu of payment, as these are seen as a form of wealth and are mainly sacrificed in ancestral ceremonies rather than eaten as food. The rainy season is the time when Mikea are most likely to leave their scavenging encampments for wage labor opportunities in villages or for the corn harvest. This is also the time when Masikoro and Vezo villagers are most likely to move into the forest to grow corn.

== Bibliography ==
- Bradt, Hilary; Austin, Daniel (2007). Madagascar (9th ed.). Guilford, CT: The Globe Pequot Press Inc. pp. 113–115. ISBN 978-1-84162-197-5.
- Kelly, RL; Rabedimy, JF; Poyer, L (1999). "The Mikea of Madagascar". In Lee, Richard; Daly, Richard (eds.). The Cambridge Encyclopedia of Hunters and Gatherers. Cambridge, U.K.: Cambridge University Press. pp. 215–219. ISBN 978-0-521-57109-8.
