= Binao =

Queen of the Sakalava people

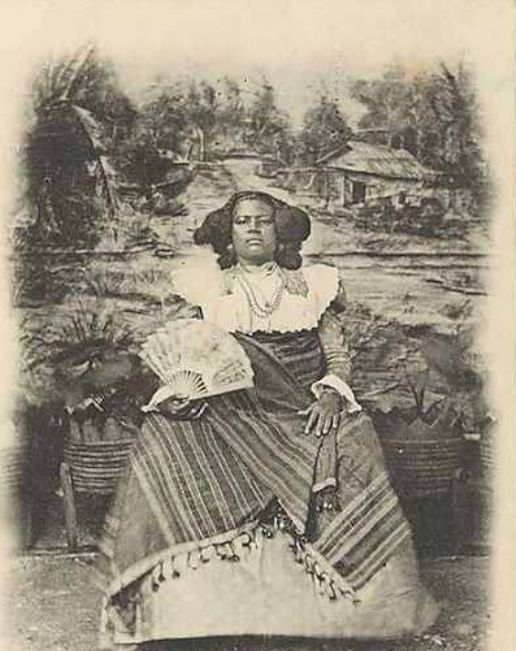
Postcard depiction of Queen Binao, circa 1904.

Binao (1867–1927) was a queen regnant of the Sakalava people of Madagascar between 1881 and 1927.

== Life ==
She was the granddaughter of King Andriantsoly of the Boina Kingdom, and acceded in 1881 to the throne of the Bemihisatra group of the Sakalava following the death of her mother, Safy Mozongo. She controlled a relatively small territory on the north-western coast of Madagascar consisting of the island of Nosy Be and a stretch of the mainland coast opposite.

During the early years of her reign she faced the challenge posed by the ambitions of the mainland's dominant power, the Merina Kingdom.

Binao allied with France when it intervened in Malagasy politics in the first of the Franco-Hova Wars between 1883–85. The war ended with France taking de facto control of Madagascar's foreign policy and recognising the Merina as the dominant native power on the island, a development that was a considerable disappointment to Binao.

In 1894–95 France pursued its second Madagascar expedition against the Merina, which ended with the French taking full control of the island and establishing the Malagasy Protectorate. The Merina monarch, Ranavalona III, was exiled to the French colonies of Réunion and later Algeria. Binao supported the French intervention and opposed the Menalamba rebellion against the French two years later. She was confirmed by the French as ruler or gouverneur principal of Nosy Be, which had effectively been converted into an internal protectorate within colonial Madagascar under the French politique des races (a form of divide and rule).

Relations with the French deteriorated dramatically in 1918 when a serious dispute arose over the legitimacy of levying corvée labour under the traditional practice of fanompoana, in which Sakalava subjects paid their respects to their deceased ancestors and reconfirmed their loyalty to the monarch. Binao had been required to obtain French permission for work on the royal tombs but she had sought to evade it by sending a request which was timed to reach the colonial authorities after the work had already begun. The plan failed and resulted in reprisals against subjects who participated in the fanompoana and against Binao herself, who was evicted from her doany (royal palace) and made to pass it on to her half-brother Amada. She was forced to live instead in the town of Hellville (now Andoany), inflicting a humiliating blow against the monarchy. Amada succeeded her as king on her death and reigned until 1963.
