= Masikoro =

Agricultural group in Madagascar

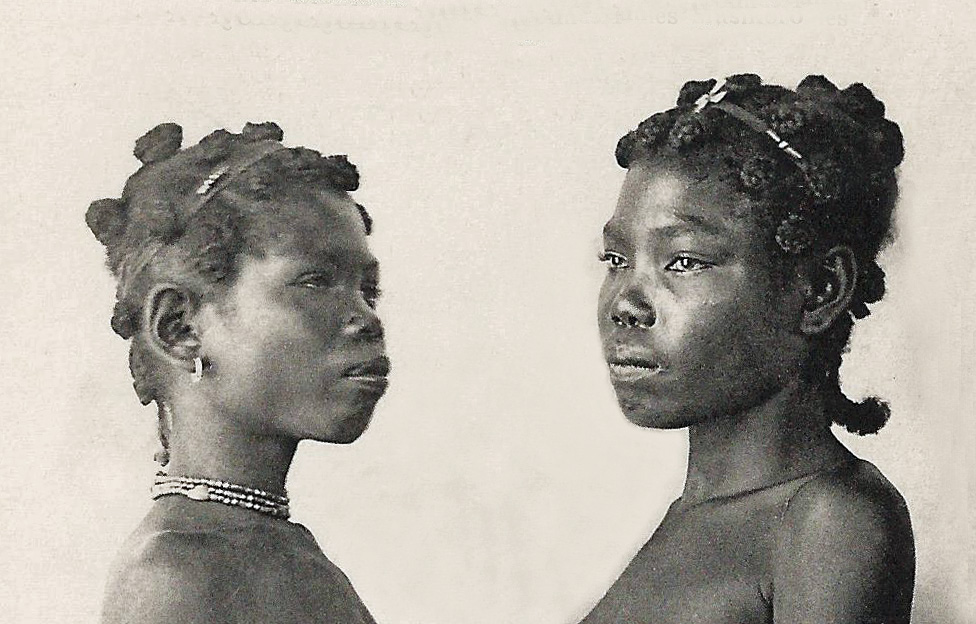
Masikoro girls

The Masikoro are a group of farmers and herders who inhabit areas surrounding the Mikea Forest, a patch of mixed spiny forest and dry deciduous forest along the coast of southwestern Madagascar in Toliara Province. Along with Vezo and Mikea, the Masikoro are Sakalava people, the difference being that Masikoro are of the land, Vezo are of the sea, and Mikea are of the forest.

== Ethnicity ==
Some 90,000 of the Masikoro people, mainly concentrated in the districts of Toliara and Morombe, speak the Masikoro-Malagasy language, a dialect of the Malagasy language. At one time there was a Masikoro kingdom with a king ruling the territory. Masikoro according to some means "Those dressed in clothing made from rushes". The Masikoro belong ethnically to the Sakalava people along with the Mikea and the Vezo fishermen, which trade products caught, foraged or cultivated in the forest among themselves. Some of the clan names are shared between the Masikoro and Mikea peoples.

== Economy ==
As agropastoralists, the Masikoro typically raise cattle and cultivate maize and manioc "semi-intensively on a 12-to 15-month schedule". Weekly markets are held in villages of the Masikoro people in which the Mikea trade their products made from the forest such as honey, tambotrika, (Note: Tambotrika is a species of Tenrec that weighs about 0.4 kilograms (0.88 lb). It is caught year round, and is an important source of flesh.) tavolo powder, and ovy. Masikoro sell maize, manioc and rice from carts in Belo.

== Culture ==
Historically, Sakalava kings resided among the Masikoro, rather than the Vezo, as the Masikoro have had more power and a larger population. It was important for the king to have a reliable boat available for transport, so if a Masikoro damaged a Vezo canoe, the punishment was beheading. Masikoro have "long, curly hair; high and broad foreheads; large and deep-set eyes; and wide nostrils". The women pound maize and rise on a daily basis, which calluses the thumb base. Funerals may continue for weeks or even longer.
