= Vezo people =

Vezo
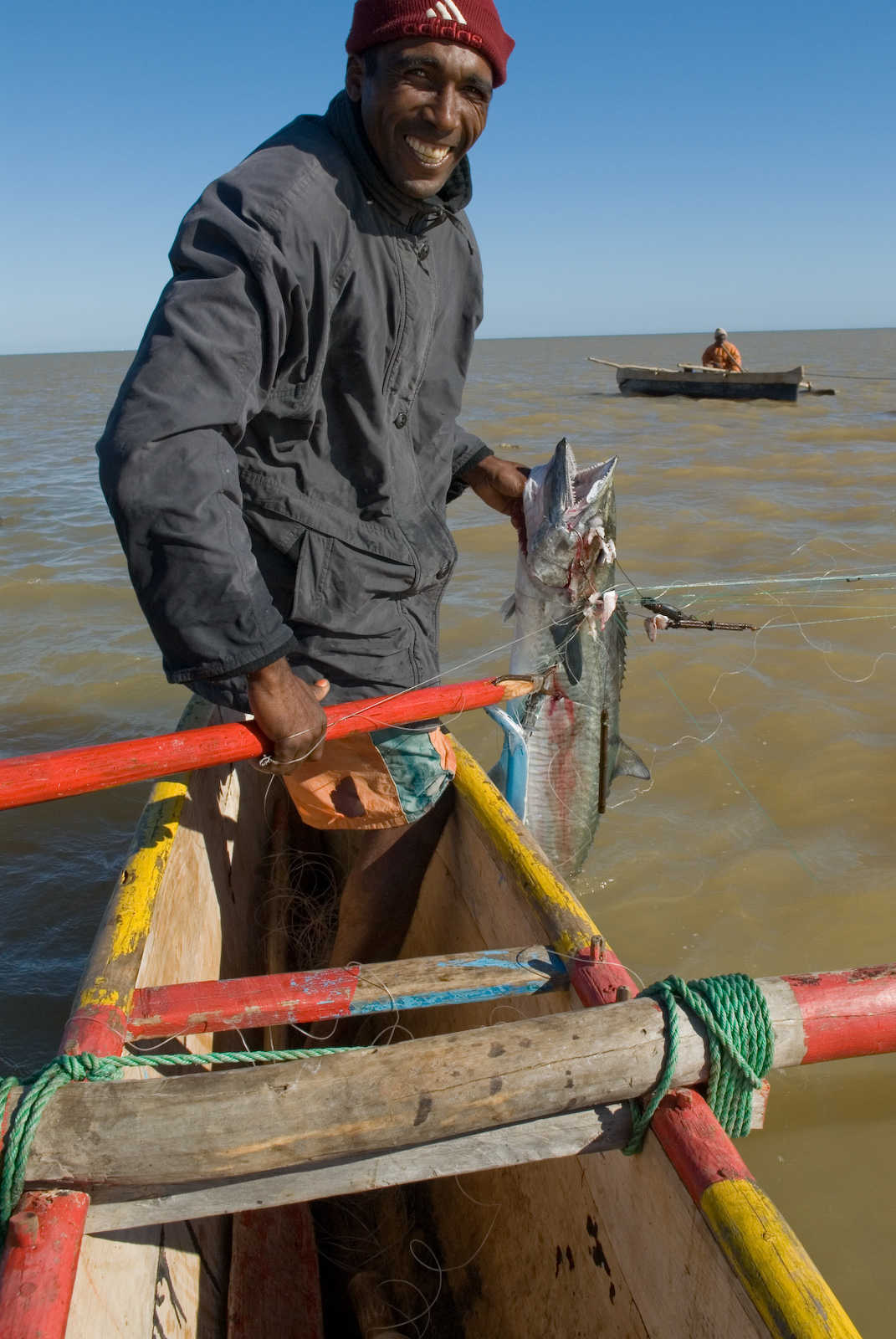
- Vezo fisherman

Total population
- 1,200

Regions with significant populations
- Toliara; Majunga (Minority)

Languages
- Southern Sakalava, Vezo dialect

Religion
- Christianity and Ancestral religion

The Vezo is the term the semi-nomadic coastal people of southern Madagascar use to refer to people that have become accustomed to live from sea fishing. The Vezo speak a dialect of the Malagasy language, which is a branch of the Malayo-Polynesian language group derived from the Barito languages, spoken in southern Borneo. They currently populate most of the littoral zone along Madagascar's west coast between Toliara and Mahajanga.

"Vezo" literally means 'the people who fish', but also has been known to mean 'to struggle with the sea'.

== Identity ==
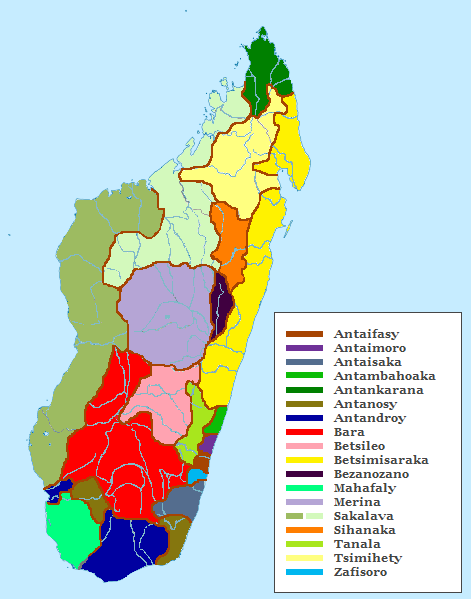
Distribution of Malagasy ethnic groups. The Vezo are classified with the Sakalava people.

Vezo do not identify with a particular Malagasy ethnic group but instead with their way of life. They currently populate most of the littoral zone along Madagascar's west coast between Toliara and Mahajanga. Like most other Malagasy ethnic groups, their origins can directly be traced to that original mix of Austronesian settlers from Asia and the Bantu migrants from mainland East Africa with Arab-Persian and Indian ancestry since the Middle Ages. They have been known to state emphatically that they need have no common origin or shared essence with one another. Their identity is instead contextual and embodied in learned skills such as fishing or swimming and the calluses they produce, rather than in shared origin. Because of their semi-nomadic marine migrations, their population is difficult to determine and has been estimated by counting the dugout canoes called pirogues (lakanas in Malagasy language) around Madagascar. The Vezo tribe is from Southwest Madagascar.

== Society ==
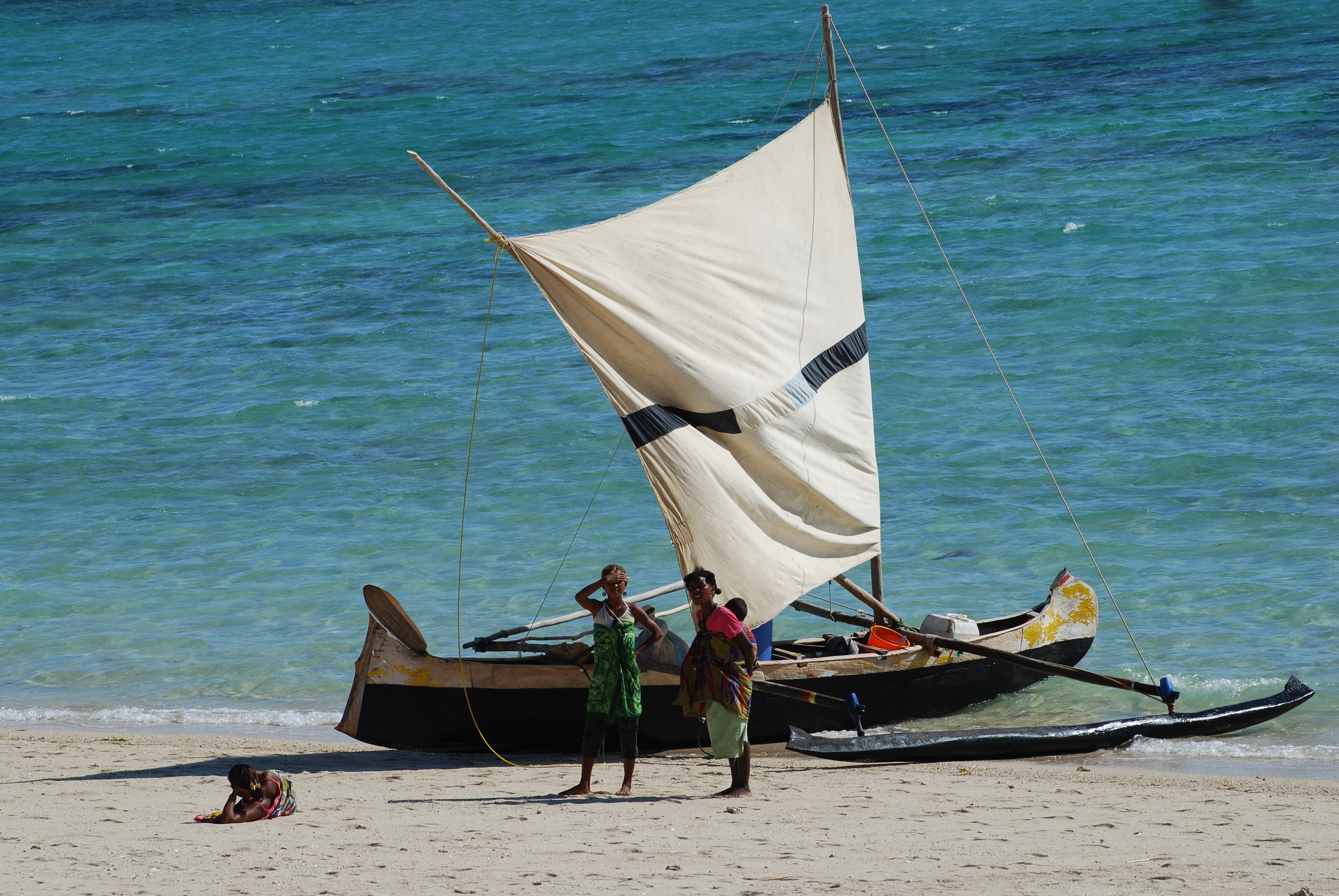
Traditional fishing lakana from Madagascar

The Vezo are a fishing people who inhabit a coastal belt extending from Intampolo in the south to Morondava in the north of southwest Madagascar. Andavadoaka is a village whose population are of the Vezo tribe. It has a population of 1,200, with over 50% under 15 years of age. Household income is mainly from fishing. Fishermen make use of mangroves for timber, wood, and fishing. The fishers participate in an artisanal fishery reliant on pirogues (canoes, made by hollowing out a large log) powered by sail and paddle, and most fishing occurs 5 km or less from shore. Men predominantly fish with line, nets, and spears. Women glean the reef flats for invertebrates including octopus and sea cucumbers. Fish sales, processing and trade supplement local income, as does tourism and local commerce.

The Vezo traditionally traded with the neighboring agro-foresters, the Masikoro. The Vezo also trade with the Mikea, exchanging fish for honey and tubers. However, increased trade has changed the economy from barter to cash-based. Furthermore, growth in fish export from Madagascar has encouraged fish processing and export companies to the region, such as Murex and Copefrito (now operating in the southwest). Their purchases of marine products have increased fish demand and strengthened the cash economy. Besides gleaning from the reef flats, women are the ones who sell the catches that men bring them. With what they earn, women buy rice, the staple food, as well as other essential foodstuffs and a variety of luxury items. Children go to school in the one village school building, where there are two designated teachers. However, due to the deterioration of public administration in Madagascar, the building and the teachers are hardly ever occupied. Whenever children are in the building, and if the teacher has not run out of chalk, the teaching largely consists in copying letters, numbers, and short sentences from the blackboard onto the child's own A5 size blackboard. Understandably, the many children who do not own a blackboard are allowed to play in the burning heat outside.

Family ties are extremely important among the Vezo and elders are greatly respected in the community. Families often provide for each other with younger members building boats for the elderly to use. Maintaining family ties is important to ensure that one is looked after in old age, or after an accident or ill health. Family relationships are particularly important to Vezo fishers because they determine access to marine resources and fishing gear.

== Culture ==
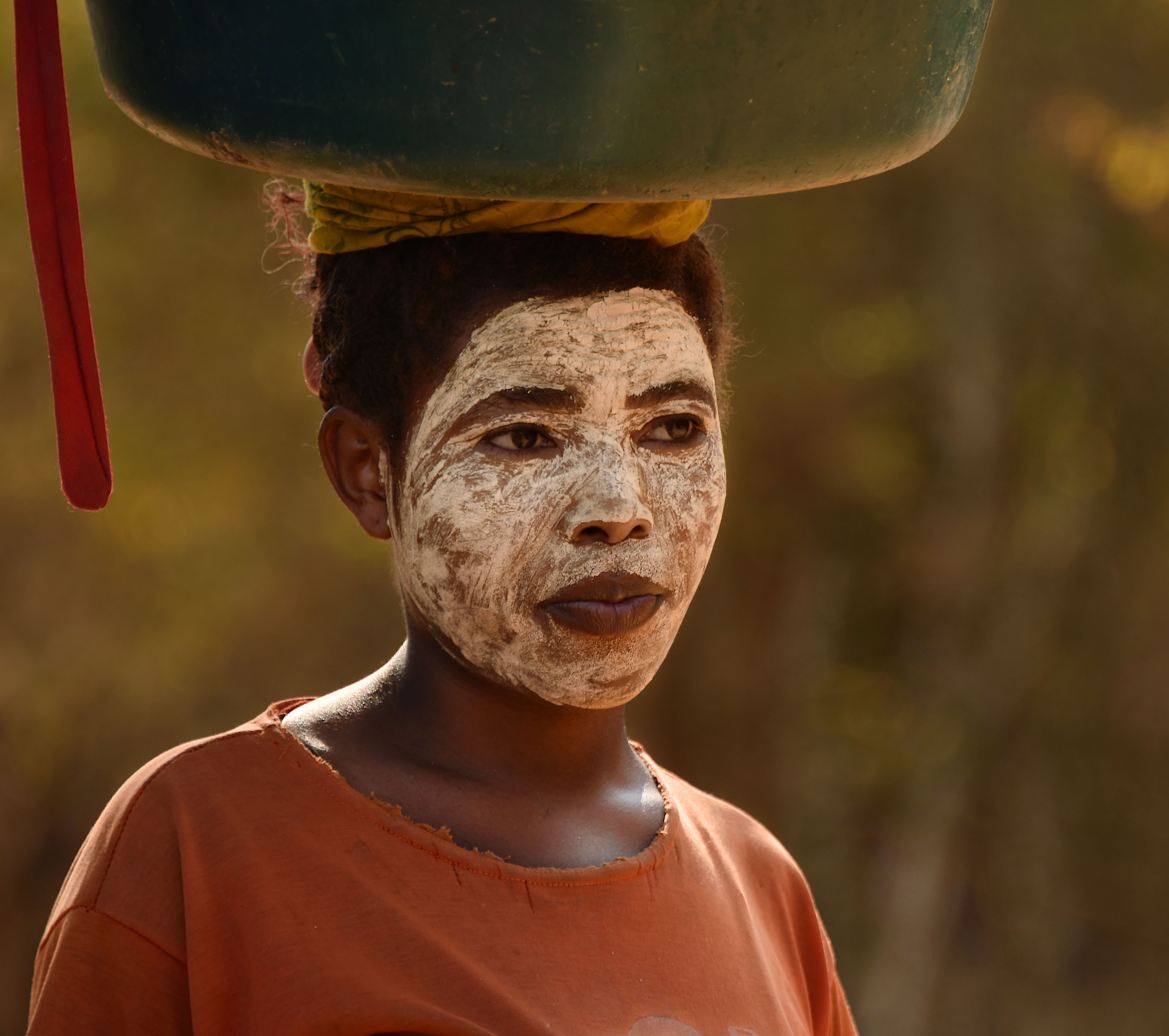
A Malagasy woman wearing masonjoany, a cosmetic paste ubiquitous among Vezo women.

The Vezo have official cultural ceremonies called Fomba. These include Bilo, Tromba, Savatse, Takasy and Soro. All these ceremonies, except Takasy, are practiced (with some variations) by the neighbouring inland Masikoro people.

The circumcision ceremony typically lasts from 4 am until 9 am. The parents ask a wise elder to suggest the best date and time for the ceremony, and identify a nurse or doctor who knows how to perform the circumcision. Family members are invited to attend the ceremony, and one of the uncles holds the child during the ceremony. After the physical cut, there is drinking of alcohol. After the ceremony the child is called savatse.

=== Fady ===
The community life of the Vezo, as elsewhere in Madagascar, is guided by numerous fady (taboos). During the course of the life of a Vezo man, he is exposed to the danger of catching hanimboky, a very unpleasant disease that only affects men. The name literally means 'swollen/full with food', which makes it considered thus a male pregnancy. A man sick with hanimboky is constipated and this causes his stomach to swell up until it resembles the belly of a pregnant woman. The illness is caused by food that the male kin of a sexually active woman accepted and ate from her. The food is said to be dirty, for it is assumed that the woman had acquired it with 'tangy', the presents her lover gives her for having sex with him. When a man accepts food from one of his female kin, it is therefore as if he were receiving food from the woman's lover; if a man accepted such food, he would be put in a very inferior position. In essence, they are treated as if they were women by their daughter's or sister's lover.

=== Funeral rites ===
Vezo cemeteries lie in the forest, far away from the villages and are so well hidden by the vegetation that they are considered "invisible to the eye". The cemeteries must be hidden in this way because the sight of tombs makes the people sad and unhappy. Cemeteries are not places the Vezo like to visit very often. One does not simply go for a stroll near the cemetery. The living only approach a cemetery when they bear a corpse or when they have to "work" for the dead, such as digging graves and building tombs.

In western Madagascar, Sakalava and Vezo funerary sculpture is renowned internationally for its erotic wooden figures, often depicted during copulation and showing oversized phalluses and breasts. It is unknown as to why the sculptures have this sort of eroticism, but it may have to do with meeting growing tourist demand.

Even after their ancestors have passed, the Vezo keep them involved in many different affairs. Many events in the productive, reproductive and social life of any Vezo family require that the dead be promptly informed, for example if one intends to move to a temporary fishing location, if one is moving into a newly built house or is launching a new canoe, if one is having a difficult birth or if a newborn is brought out of the house for the first time, if one is about to sit a school exam, if difficult words have been spoken which make people's heart heavy with anger, if the visiting anthropologist arrives or leaves, and so on. It is the responsibility of the senior head of the family to call the dead and talk to them, asking for their protection or their forgiveness, and ensuring that they are kept well informed of life's events – for whenever the dead have reasons to be "surprised," they will want to ask questions, thereby causing trouble for the living.

The dead communicate with their living descendants through the dreams that they induce in them. This is because when a person dies, the breathing stops, the body becomes stiff, cold and soon begins to stink and to decompose. But when a person dies, the 'spirit' – known as fanahy up to the moment of death – permanently departs from the body. In its new disembodied, ghostly form, the spirit – now known as angatse – is invisible, and moves around like wind. To be seen by living people, it enters their dreams, where it appears together with its original uncorrupted body, just as it was when the person was alive.

== Language ==
The Vezo speak a dialect of the Malagasy language, which is a branch of the Malayo-Polynesian language group derived from the Barito languages, spoken in southern Borneo.

== Economy ==
Off the coast of Madagascar, overfishing has become a major issue. The Vezo rely entirely on fishing, who for the past 2,000 years have been navigating the stretch of the Indian Ocean that separates Madagascar from the African continent in hand-carved pirogues. Increasingly, commercial boats, mostly from Asia and Europe, are fishing those same waters. Thus, it is difficult for the traditional fishermen to compete in the market. In response, many Vezo have resorted to fishing hundreds of miles offshore, spending six to nine months a year in rough and dangerous waters in search of sharks and sea cucumbers, both in high demand in Asian seafood markets. Some bring their families and all their possessions and set up camp on sandbars far from civilization.

Fishermen believe that the current fishing practices have to change by keeping successful skills, removing destructive fishing practices and adopting new fishing technologies. The lack of a system allowing local users to have a shared assessment of the fishing conditions and to define a common vision is the main problem for Vezo traditional fishers. They are so good at tracking the changes in fish catches over time and have a better understanding of the multiple uses of the available habitats but when it comes to pooling their knowledge into one system, they just can not make it by themselves. This shows that traditional ways of solving problems have failed to make its way to modern days. Traditional leaders used to play an important role in preserving wealth of the community by providing guidance to resource users according to the best available judgment. This role has been weakened by several factors including his social status.

Even worse, there is no significant improvement of household revenue in short term by setting up a marine reserve, it is hoped that the approach is likely to bring a much bigger impact on targeted fisheries in a mid and long term exploitation. From a biological point of view, a larger female octopus for example tends to lay many more eggs than young ones. By providing a few more months to grow in a closed fishing ground, it allows octopus individuals to get to bigger sizes.

The Vezo have a long history of subsistence turtle exploitation and associated cultural traditions. By local law, turtles are protected under Decree 24 passed in 1923, but this law has seldom been enforced. The low reproductive potential and delayed sexual maturity of turtles make all species unsuitable for intensive harvest. Even as far back as the early twentieth century, it has been reported that turtles play an important role to Malagasy fisheries. There has been a decline in numbers of the hawksbill turtle and the disappearance of nesting populations. The raiding of the turtle nests and hunting for the meat and carapaces are believed to be the fundamental causes of decline for four of the five species in the region.

== See also ==
- Demographics of Madagascar
- Andavadoaka
