= Mazalagem Nova =

17th century trading port in Madagascar

Mazalagem Nova or Massaliege was a major trading depot in the 17th-century located on the island of Nosy Antsoheribory in Boina Bay on the coast of Madagascar.

Mazalegem Nova was founded in the late 16th century by people known in Madagascar as Antalaotra. This term referred to merchant sailors, primarily originating in the Swahili settlements along the east coast of Africa.

By 1650 there were between 6,000 and 7,000 residents of Mazalagem Nova. The vast majority were Muslims. It was a center for the slave trade exporting slaves from Madagascar to Arabia. The exporters of slaves primarily came from Pate, Malindi, Lamu and Surat. Tortoise shell and wood were also purchased by these traders. Swahili was more widely spoken than Malagasy.

As of 1676 the ruler was Hamet Boedachar who held the title of Sultan. He had a wife who was described as being either Arab or Swahili, but also had several Malagasy concubines. His army numbered about 5,000 soldiers plus their slaves. Hamet Boedachar limited his actual power to a small base on the coast and did not seek to extend his power to Madagascar's interior.

In the late 17th-century Mazalagem Nova was conquered by Andrimandisoarivo the founder of the Boina Kingdom. Andrimandisoarivo's army that conquered Mazalagem Nova included 20 soldiers who were Anglo-Americans originally from the Province of New York.

== Sources ==
- Solofo Randrianja and Stephen Ellis, Madagascar: A Short History (Chicago: University of Chicago Press, 2009) p. 91-92.
