= Zalifa Bente Salim =

Malagasy politician

Zalifa Bente Salim is a Malagasy politician and the Queen of the Sakalava-Analalava kingdom.

She had been a daughter of the queen Augustine Soazara and of the governor Salimo Ben Issa and was born in 1958.

== Political career ==
She was a member of the National Assembly of Madagascar, she was elected from the Fanjava Velogno party in the 1998 Malagasy parliamentary elections, reelected in 2002 and in 2007. She represented the constituency of Analalava.
