= Solofo Randrianja =

Historian of Madagascar

- Citizenship: Madagascar

Academic background
- Education: Paris Diderot University
- Thesis: Le Parti Communiste (Section Française de l'Internationale Communiste) de la Région de Madagascar, 1936-39, genèse, développement et décomposition (2004)
- Doctoral advisor: Françoise Raison-Jourde
- Other advisors: Catherine Coquery-Vidrovitch, Michelle Perrot

Academic work
- Discipline: Historian
- Sub-discipline: History of Madagascar

Solofo Randrianja is a Malagasy scholar and historian of Madagascar. He is currently a professor at University of Toamasina and, with Stephen Ellis, wrote Madagascar: A Short History, a foundational reference work for the field.

== Life ==
=== Education and early career ===
Randrianja was raised in Madagascar, where his father was a political organizer.

Randrianja earned a Ph.D. and habilitation from the Denis Diderot University of Paris VII. During political unrest in Madagascar, Randrianja was a potential target due to his advocacy of democracy. He and his family fled to Chicago.

=== Later career ===
With Stephen Ellis, Randrianja wrote Madagascar: A Short History, considered by the Africanist academic community to be a critical reference work in Malagasy history. In fact, the only prior history of Madagascar written in English was published in 1995 by British diplomat Mervyn Brown. During this time, he was also awarded a fellowship at the African Studies Centre Leiden. Following the 2009 Malagasy coup d'état, Randrianja edited and published a collection of viewpoints and analyses on the incident, Madagascar, le coup d'État de mars 2009. Later in the 2010s, Randrianja served as a fellow at the Nantes Institute for Advanced Study and at the Taiwan Foundation for Democracy.

Randrianja has been interviewed as a political expert on contemporary Madagascar politics, particularly in light of the contentious 2023 Malagasy presidential election.

He has also served as co-editor-in-chief of the journal Identity, Culture, and Politics: an Afro-Asian Dialogue (French: Identité, culture et politique : un dialogue afro-asiatique).

== Selected works ==
- Madagascar: A Short History (with Stephen Ellis) ISBN 9781850658924
- Madagascar: Ethnies Et Ethnicité (ed., with Robert Jaovelo-Dzao) ISBN 9782869781337
- Madagascar, le coup d'État de mars 2009 (ed.) ISBN 9782811106058
- Société et luttes anticoloniales à Madagascar: de 1896 à 1946 ISBN 9782845861367
- La nation malgache au défi de l'ethnicité (with Françoise Raison-Jourde) ISBN 9782845861367
