= Malagasy peoples =

Austronesian ethnic group

Malagasy
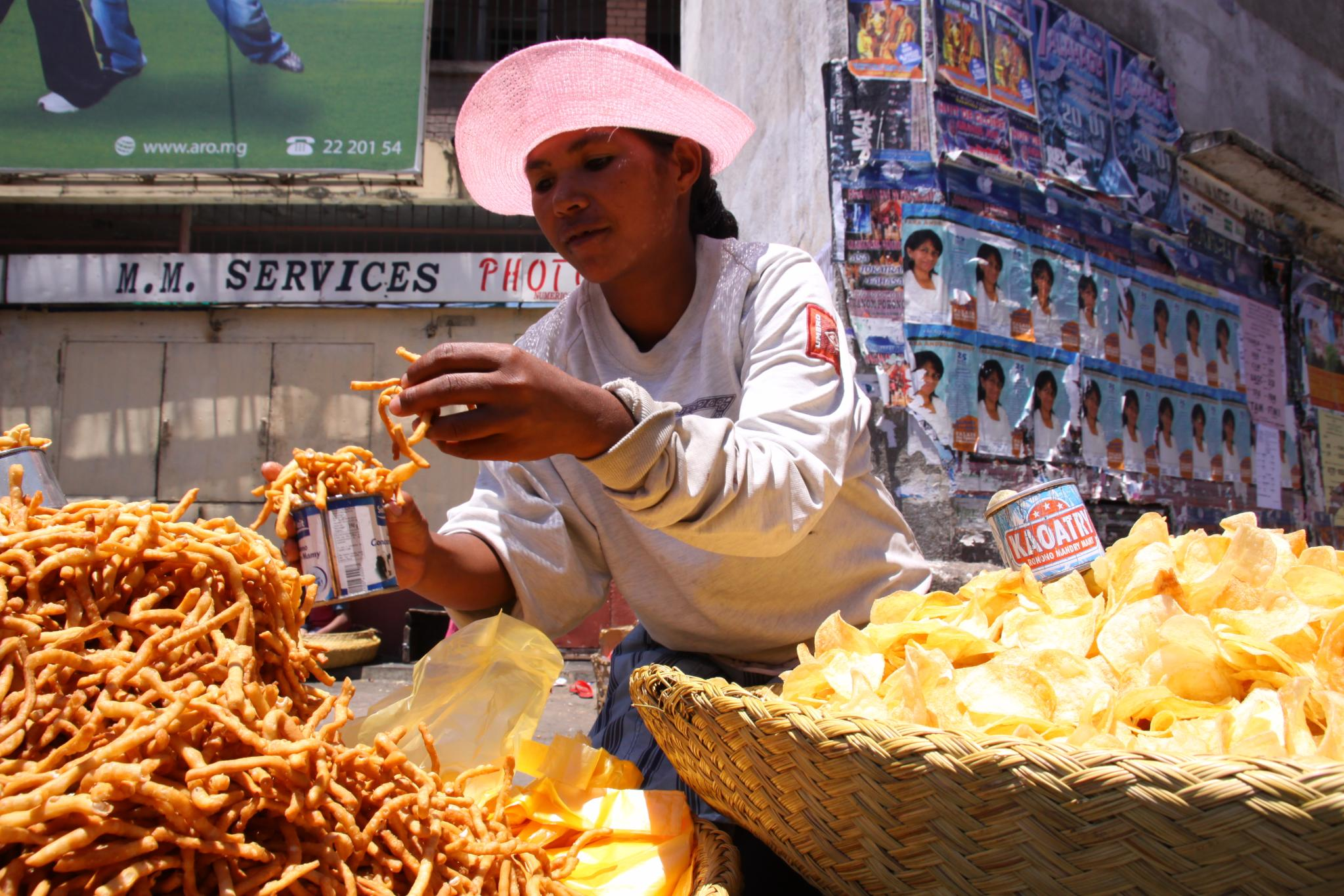
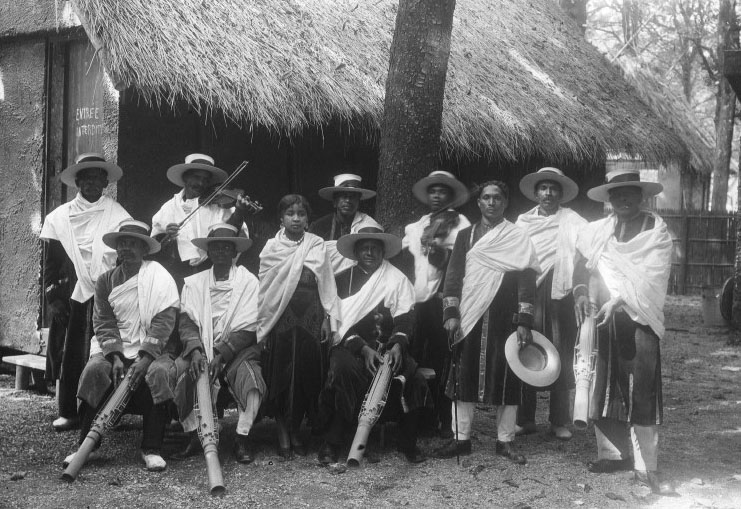
- Top: A Malagasy street vendor Bottom: A traditional Malagasy valiha orchestra

Total population
- c. 30+ million

Regions with significant populations
- Madagascar, Comoros, Mayotte, Réunion, Mauritius, France, United Kingdom, United States, South Africa, Australia, Canada, New Zealand, Peru

Languages
- Malagasy (L1); French (L2)

Religion
- Predominantly; Christianity; Minorities indigenous Malagasy religion

Related ethnic groups
- Austronesian peoples; Bantu peoples; Cape Coloureds; Ma'anyan; Banjar; Dusun; Paku; Lawangan; Yakan; Sama-Bajau; other Barito; Ngaju; Ambonese; Moluccans; Native Oceanians

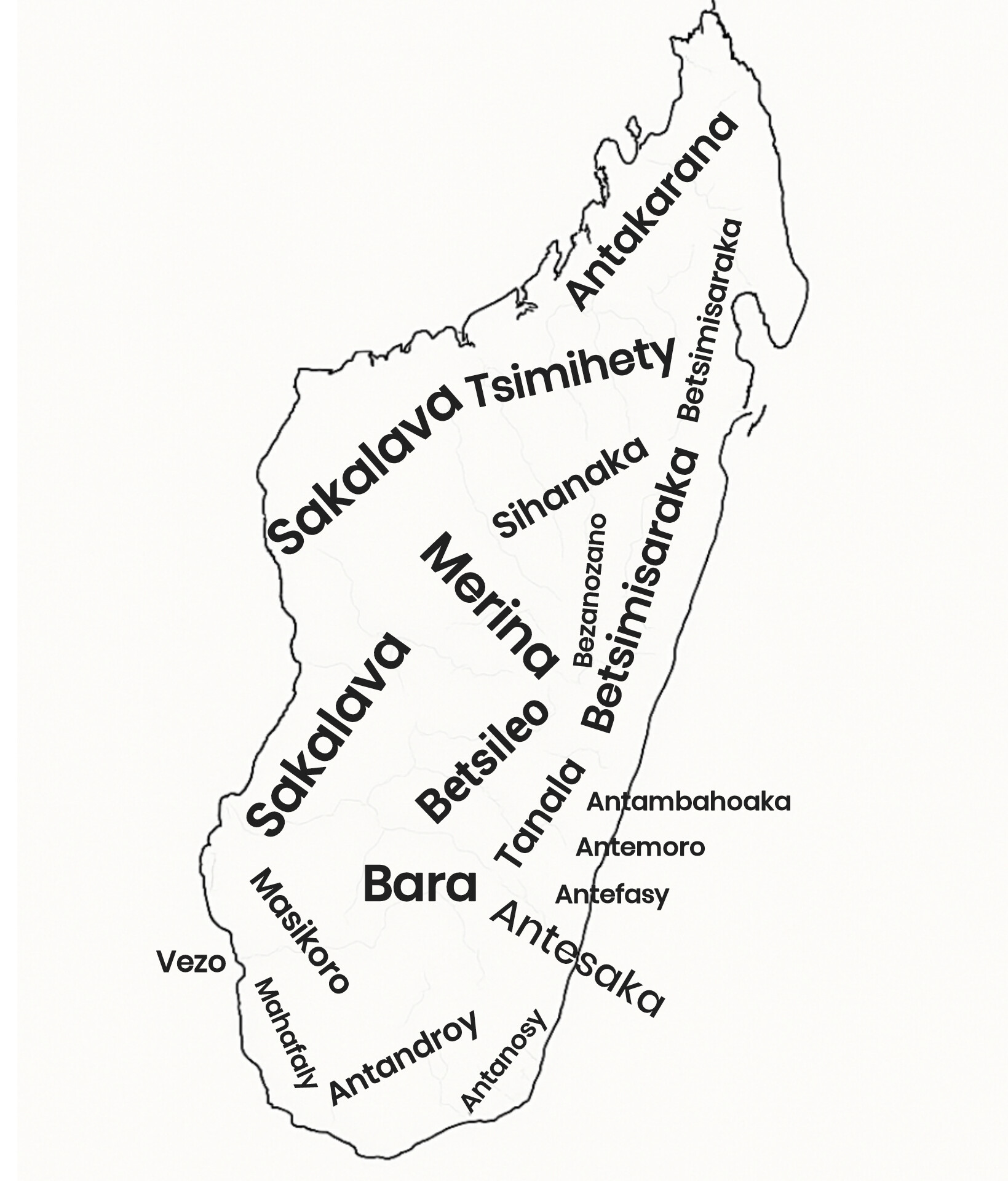
Distribution of major Malagasy tribes.

The Malagasy (Note: Malagasy: Gasy; French: Malgache) are an Austronesian-speaking ethnic group and nation indigenous to the island country of Madagascar. They emerged over several centuries through interaction between Austronesians from Maritime Southeast Asia, (who settled mainly in the island's interior) and Bantu migrants from Southeast Africa (who arrived later, and established communities along the coasts). Traditionally, the Malagasy have been divided into various sub-ethnic groups: The "Highlanders," such as the Merina and Betsileo of the central highlands around Antananarivo, Alaotra (Ambatondrazaka) and Fianarantsoa, tend to have more Austronesian ancestry; in contrast, the "coastal dwellers," including the Sakalava, Bara, Vezo, Betsimisaraka, and Mahafaly, generally have a higher proportion of Bantu ancestry.

The Merina are broadly divided into two subgroups that differ in their ancestral composition: The first subgroup, often referred to as the "Merina A," includes the Hova and Andriana classes, who possess approximately 77 percent Asian ancestry (mainly from Borneo and other Austronesian peoples, with around 7 percent Han-related), 20 percent African ancestry (largely Bantu and Yoruba-related), and about 3 percent from other origins. The second subgroup, known as the "Merina B" (or Andevo), have roughly 50 percent African ancestry, 46 percent Asian (primarily Austronesian with minor Han-related ancestry), and 4 percent from other sources. The Malagasy population was 2,242,000 in the first census in 1900. Their population experienced tremendous growth in the next hundred years, especially during the French colonial period when the country was known as French Madagascar.

== Genetics and origins of the populations ==
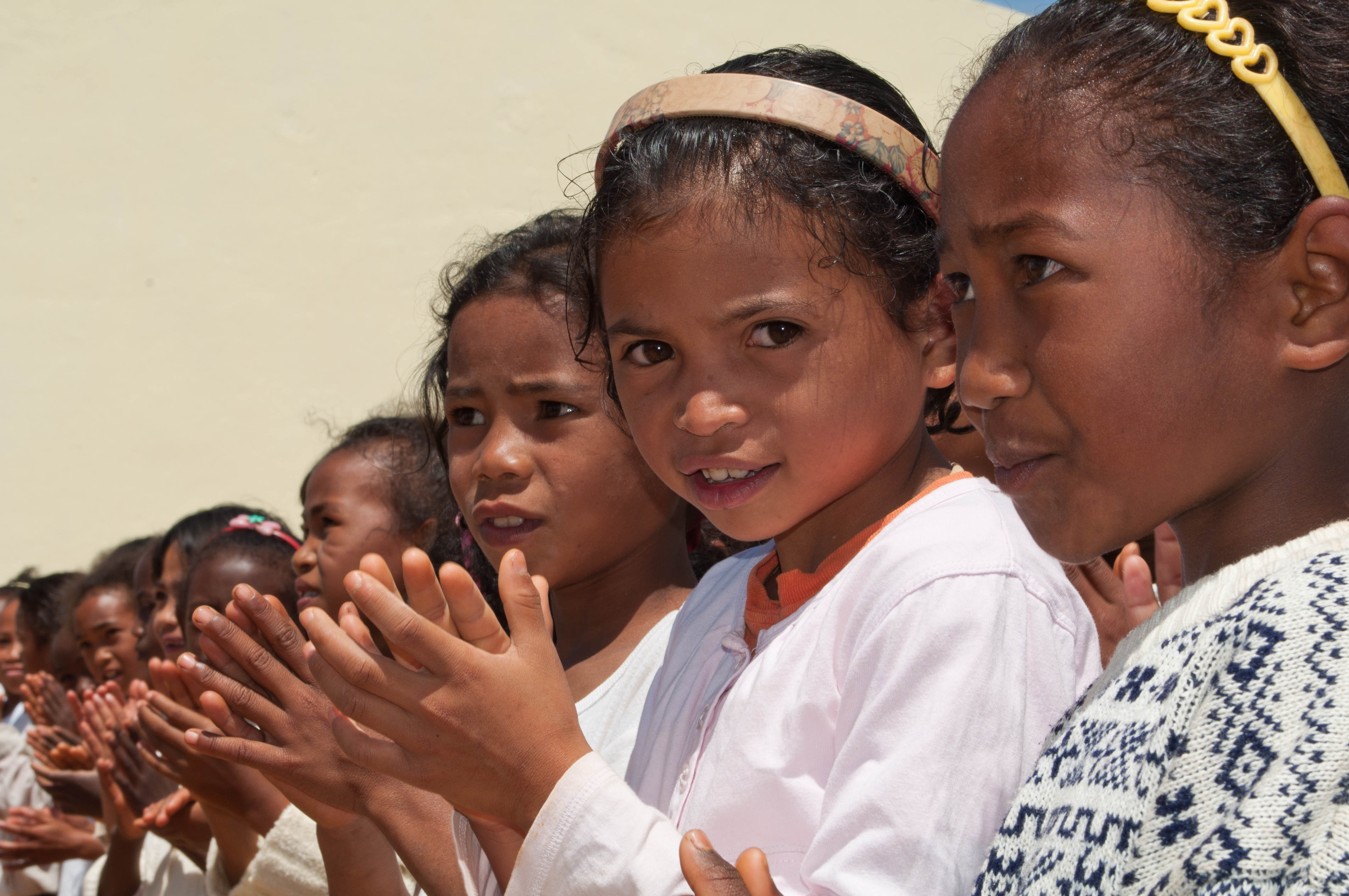
Merina children

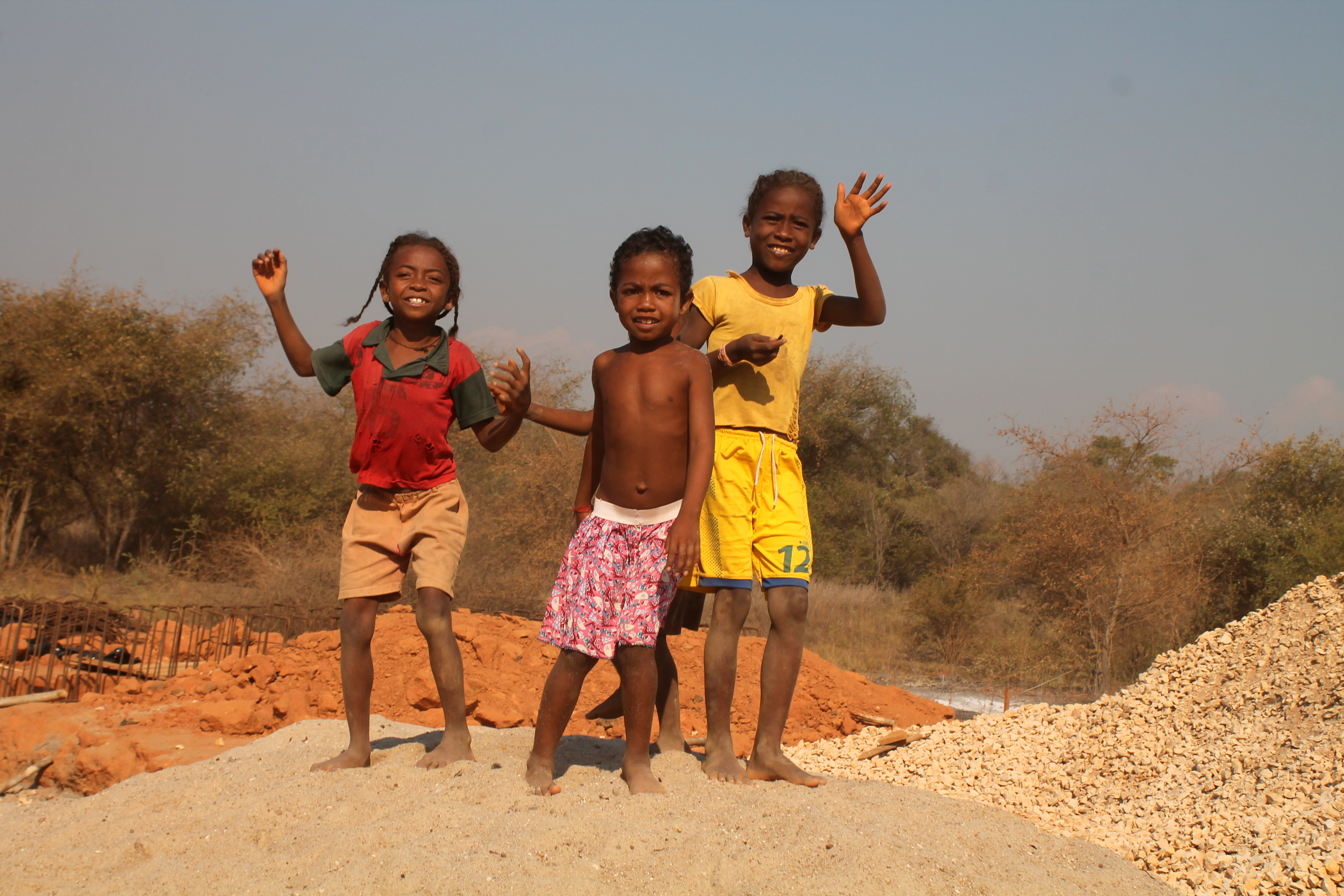
Sakalava children

An island-wide survey of the genetic diversity was performed from 2008 to 2018. This project was called "MAGE" (for Madagascar, Anthropology Genetics Ethno-linguistic). Around 3000 inhabitants of Madagascar participated in this study and provided their saliva for a genetic study. Three hundred villages across Madagascar were sampled in terms of genetic, linguistic and cultural diversity. This research was led and performed by Malagasy and European researchers and academics. This study demonstrated that all Malagasy people have mixed African and Asian ancestry.

But the proportion of ancestral genes differs. Coastal Malagasy populations, including the Temoro, Vezo, and Mikea, etc. have approximately 70% African ancestry and 30% Asian ancestry, while highlander tribes tend to have lower African ancestry at around 45%. In a recent island-wide survey the male-only Y chromosomes of African origin are more common than those of East Asian origin, but it varies depending on the study (70.7 vs. 20.7 or 51% vs 34%). However the mtDNA lineages, passed down from mother to child, are the opposite (42.4% African origin vs. 50.1% East Asian origin). Male-only Y chromosome of East/Southeast Asian paternal frequencies such as Haplogroup O-M175 varies from 45% in Antalaotra, 16% in the Ampanabaka, 5% Anteony. In contrast, African male haplogroup such as E1b1a1 constituted 76% of the Ampanabaka genetic diversity, but only 7% in the Antalaotra and 12% in the Anteony.

Due to the proximity to Africa, the connection with Asian populations aroused the most curiosity. Around 1996, a study was launched in an attempt to identify the presence of the Polynesian motif in the Malagasy population (mtDNA haplotype B4a1a1a). A more recent study identified two additional mutations (1473 and 3423A) found in all Polynesian motif carriers of Madagascar, hence was named the Malagasy motif. The frequency varied among three ethnic groups: 50% in Merina, 22% in Vezo, and 13% in Mikea.

Based on this result, a study suggested that Madagascar was settled approximately 1,200 years ago by a very small group, which consisted of approximately 30 women; 28 (93%) of them had maritime Southeast Asian descent and 2 (7%) of them were of African descent. The Malagasy populations developed through the intermixing of the first small founding populations. The closest Asian parental population of the Malagasy are found in what is now Indonesia, among the Banjar and other South Kalimantan Dayak people of south east Borneo. Language footprints of their ancestors from Southeastern Asia can be traced by the many shared words of basic vocabulary with Ma'anyan, a language from the region of the Barito River in southern Borneo.

== Historical subdivisions ==
Physical difference had been always noticed by early European travellers. In early 1600s, Portuguese distinguished already "Malagasy" or "Bouki" from mainland Africans who they called as "Caffres". French traveller Dubois described Malagasy people as mixed with some looking like Indians or Mulattoes after he visited the Lahifotsy realm in Menabe. Term "Highlanders" and "Coastal dwellers" was coined by the English missionaries in the 19th century.

In addition to the distinction in term of ancestral proportion between highland and coastal Malagasy, one may speak of a political distinction as well. During the 19th and 20th centuries, the French colonial administration capitalized on and further exacerbated these political inequities by appropriating existing Merina governmental infrastructure to run their colony. This legacy of political inequity dogged the people of Madagascar after gaining independence in 1960; candidates' ethnic and regional identities have often served to help or hinder their success in democratic elections.

Within these two broad ethnic and political groupings, the Malagasy were historically subdivided into specifically named ethnic groups, who were primarily distinguished from one another on the basis of cultural practices. These were namely agricultural, hunting, or fishing practices; construction style of dwellings; music; hair and clothing styles; and local customs or taboos, the latter was known in the Malagasy language as fady. The number of such ethnic groups in Madagascar has been debated. The practices that distinguished many of these groups are less prevalent in the 21st century than they were in the past. But, many Malagasy are proud to proclaim their association with one or several of these groups as part of their own cultural identity.

- "Highlander" ethnic groups
  - Merina
  - Sihanaka
  - Bezanozano
  - Betsileo
    - Zafimaniry
- Coastal ethnic groups
  - Antaifasy or Antefasy
  - Antaimoro or Temoro or Antemoro
  - Antaisaka or Antesaka
  - Antambahoaka
  - Antandroy or Tandroy
  - Antankarana
  - Antanosy or Tanosy
  - Bara
  - Betsimisaraka
  - Mahafaly
  - Makoa
  - Mikea
  - Sakalava
  - Tanala
  - Tsimihety
  - Vezo

== Demeanour ==
In her 1985 travelogue Muddling Through in Madagascar, Irish author Dervla Murphy described her impressions of the Malagasy temperament:

...the Malagasy were readily identifiable. They looked conspicuously cheerful and relaxed; their numerous small children were neither spoiled not cowed and behaved admirably under stress; their dignified self-confidence – distinctive though hard to describe – contrasted strongly with the brash arrogance of some of our younger Asian and African fellow-internees. Malagasy charm is founded on natural good manners and spontaneous amiability, yet behind this one senses a reserve that makes one feel honoured to be accepted by a Malagasy as a friend. In Paris we had only met Merina; here we were seeing a tribal cross-section and physical differences were marked, sometimes even within the same family group. Few Malagasy could be mistaken for true Africans, yet negro genes were often as obvious as Polynesian.

== Malagasy diaspora ==
Countries with a significant Malagasy diaspora include France (specifically the overseas departments of Mayotte and Réunion), Comoros (specifically the island of Moheli), South Africa, and the United States.

The Malagasy diaspora in the United States includes those descended from people who, slave or free, came during the 18th and 19th centuries. Other Americans of Malagasy ancestry are recent immigrants from Madagascar. Some notable Americans who have Malagasy ancestry include Andy Razaf, Regina M. Anderson, William H. Hastie, George Schuyler and Philippa Schuyler, Muhammad Ali, Robert Reed Church and Mary Church Terrell, Frederick D. Gregory, Thomas P. Mahammitt, Paschal Beverly Randolph, Maya Rudolph, Claude McKay, Jess Tom, Ben Jealous, and Keenen Ivory Wayans.

The first recorded African slave in Canada, Olivier Le Jeune, was taken from Madagascar to New France in 1628.

== See also ==
- Malagasy language
- Culture of Madagascar
- Culture of Indonesia
- Culture of Oceania
- Seychellois Creole people
- Mauritian Creoles
- Cafres
- Cape Malay
