= Tsiomeko of Boina =

Last monarch of the Boina Kingdom

Tsiomeko (1828–1843) was the last queen and monarch of the Boina Kingdom in 1836-1839.

Tsiomeko was the daughter of Taratra and a grand-niece of King Andriantsoly, who was driven out of Boina by the Merina armies and whom her father had served as a "souer". She became queen in 1836, at age eight, succeeding Queen Oantitsy, the sister of King Andriantsoly. In 1839 she was driven out of her residence by Hova and fled to Nosy Komba. There, she asked for French protection and Admiral de Hell signed a deal with the queen to make Boina a French protectorate.

Tsiomeko ceased to be Queen when her Kingdom was annexed to the Merina Kingdom in 1840. She died in 1843.
