= Michael Lambek =

Canadian anthropologist

Michael Lambek FRSC
- Born: Michael Joshua Lambek; 11 June 1950 (age 76)

Academic background
- Education: McGill University; University of Michigan

Academic work
- Discipline: Anthropology
- Sub-discipline: Anthropology of religion
- Institutions: University of Toronto Scarborough

Michael Joshua Lambek FRSC (born 11 June 1950) is a Canadian anthropologist who serves as professor of anthropology at the University of Toronto Scarborough. He is a specialist in the anthropology of religion. Lambek is known for his works on Mayotte and its people.

== Selected publications ==
- Human Spirits: A Cultural Account of Trance in Mayotte (1981)
- Knowledge and Practice in Mayotte: Local Discourses of Islam, Sorcery and Spirit Possession (1993)
- Tense Past (edited with Paul Antze, 1996)
- Ecology and the Sacred (edited with Ellen Messer, 2001)
- The Weight of the Past: Living with History in Mahajanga, Madagascar (2002)
- Illness and Irony (edited with Paul Antze, 2003)
- A Reader in the Anthropology of Religion (2nd ed. 2008)
- Ordinary Ethics: Anthropology, Language, and Action (ed. 2010)
- Island in the Stream: An Ethnographic History of Mayotte (2018)
- Concepts and Persons (2021)
- Behind the Glass: The Villa Tugendhat and Its Family (2022)
- Cohabiting with Spirits: The Biography of a Marriage in Mayotte (2025)
