= Boina Kingdom =

Kingdom in Madagascar (1690–1840)

Kingdom of Boina Fanjakan'Iboina (Malagasy)
- 1690–1840
- Flag
- Status: 1690–1820: Independent state 1820–1832: Tributary state of Imerina; 1832–1840: Military occupation
- Capital: Boina Bay
- Common languages: Northern Sakalava
- Religion: Traditional faiths Islam
- Government: Monarchy
  - 1690–1720: Andriamandisoarivo (first)
  - 1836–1840: Tsiomeko (last)
- History
  - Established: 1690
  - Occupied by Imerina: 1832
  - Annexed by Imerina: 1840
Preceded by
Antalaotra
Mananadabo
Sandragoaty
Antambohilava
Succeeded by
Merina Kingdom
- Today part of: Madagascar

The Kingdom of Boina (sometimes known as Iboina or in Sakalava as Boeny) was a traditional state situated in what is now Madagascar.

== History ==
The kingdom was founded c. 1690 by King Andriamandisoarivo. Andrimandisoarivo was a son of Andriandahifotsy, the founder of the Sakalava Kingdom, and had that kingdom after a succession dispute for the north, where he founded his own kingdom. It was centered on Boina Bay in north-west Madagascar.

By the 1690s about 500 European pirates had set up bases of operation along the northern coast of Madagascar. Andrianamboniarivo had as his chief minister for a time Tom Similaho whose father was an English pirate and whose mother was a Malagasy woman.

Some time after 1832 it was occupied by Imerina and was annexed by Madagascar in 1840. The last ruler of this kingdom was Queen Tsiomeko.

Boina in the north west and Menabe in the west were the kingdoms sprong in the 18th century. The king of Boina was considered to be quasi-divine, interceding with god and ancestors. The land belonged to him. In the extreme north of the island the Antankarana kingdom paid tribute to Boina.

== Rulers of Boina ==
The list of rulers of Boina:

- c. 1690-1720 – Andriamandisoarivo (Tsimanata)
- c. 1720-1730 – Andrianamboniarivo (Toakafa)
- c. 1730-1760 – Andriamahatindriarivo
- c. 1760-1767 – Andrianahilitsy
- 1767-1770 – Andrianiveniarivo
- 1770-1771 – Andrianihoatra
- 1771–1777 – Andrianikeniarivo
- 1777–1778 – Andrianaginarivo (f)
- 1778 – Tombola (f)
- c. 1778–1808 – Ravahiny (f)
- 1808–1822? – Tsimalomo
- 1808 – Maka (Andrianaresy) (pretender)
- 1822–1832 – Andriantsoly
- 1828–1829 – Oantitsy (f) – Regent
- 1832–1836 – Oantitsy (f)
- 1836–1840 – Tsiomeko (f)

== See also ==
- Boeny
