= Sakalava people =

Ethnic group in Madagascar

Sakalava
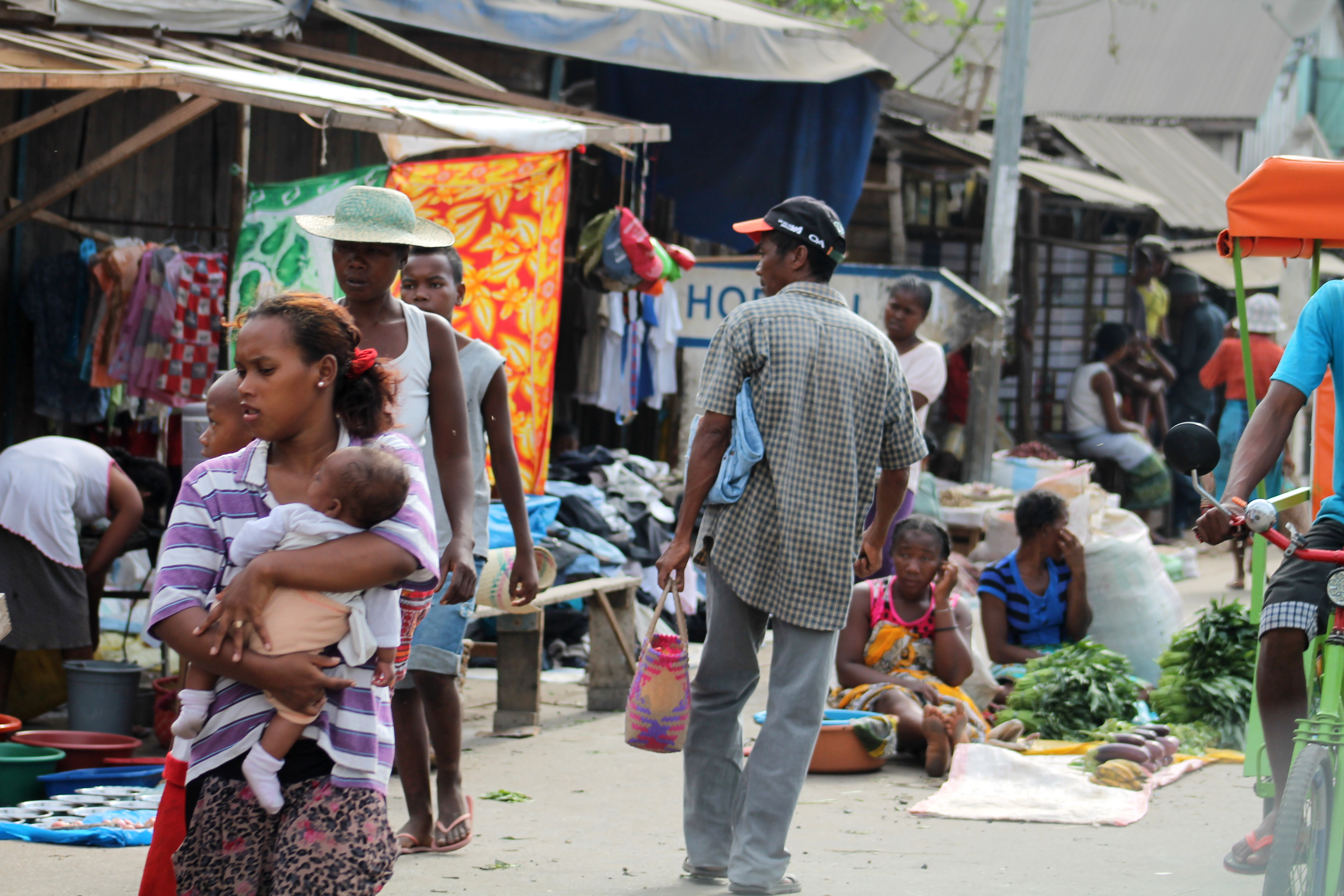
- Sakalava people near Morondava

Total population
- 2,079,000

Regions with significant populations
- Madagascar

Languages
- Southern Sakalava, Northern Sakalava

Religion
- Christianity (Catholicism, commoners), Fomba Gasy (traditional religion), Islam (royalty)

Related ethnic groups
- Other Malagasy groups, Bantu peoples, Austronesian peoples

The Sakalava are an ethnic group primarily found on the western edge of Madagascar, ranging from Toliara in the south to the Sambirano River in the north. They constitute about 6.2 percent of the total population of Madagascar, or about 2,079,000 in 2018.

The origin of the word Sakalava is not fully known. The most common explanation is that their name means "people of the long valleys", or a similar modern Malagasy translation of long ravines, which denotes the relatively flat nature of the land in western Madagascar. Another theory is that the word is possibly from the Arabic saqaliba (which is in turn derived from Late Latin sclavus), meaning slave.

== History ==
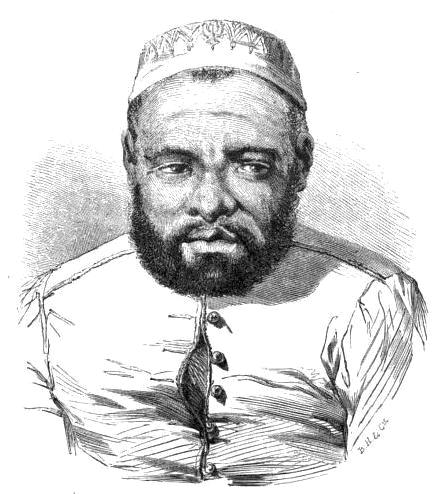
Sakalava ruler Andriantsoly (1820–1824).

The Sakalava are considered to be a mix of Austronesian and Bantu people. Austronesian people from various southeast Asian and Oceanian groups started sailing and settling in Madagascar between 400 and 900 CE. The earliest confirmed settlements were on Nosy Mangabe and in the Mananara Valley, and date back to the eighth century. Bantu-speaking farmers, moving from Central and East Africa, arrived in Madagascar in the ninth century. According to Gwyn Campbell, "the most accurate genetic data to date indicates that the founding settlement, on the northwest coast, comprised a maximum of 20 households, totalling around 500 people, either genetically mixed, or half Austronesian and half African."

Portuguese traders were the first Europeans to arrive in the 15th century, followed by other European powers. Later, Swahilis, Arabs, Indian, and Tamil traders came to the island's northern regions. Enslaved people from mainland Africa were brought to the island in increasing numbers between the 15th and the 18th centuries, particularly to the region where Sakalava people now live. This influx of diverse peoples led to the formation of various Malagasy sub-ethnicities in the mid-2nd millennium.

The founder of Sakalava legacy was Andriamisara. After 1610, his descendant Andriandahifotsy ("the White Prince") extended his authority northwards past the Mangoky River, aided by weapons obtained through the slave trade. His two sons, Andriamanetiarivo and Andriamandisoarivo (also known as Tsimanatona) extended gains further up to the Tsongay region (now Mahajanga).

The chiefs of the different coastal settlements on the island began extending their power to control trade. The first significant Sakalava kingdoms were formed around the 1650s. They dominated the western region of Madagascar during the 1700s. The Sakalava chiefdoms of Menabe, centered in what was then known as Andakabe (now the town of Morondava), were principal among them. The influence of the Sakalava extended across what are now the provinces of Antsiranana, Mahajanga and Toliara. The Sakalava kingdom reached its peak geographic spread between 1730 and 1760, under King Andrianinevenarivo.

According to local tradition, the founders of the Sakalava kingdom were the Maroseraña (or Maroseranana, "those who owned many ports") princes, from Fiherenana (now Toliara). They may also be descended from the Zafiraminia (sons of Ramini) clans from the southwestern part of the island. The demand for slaves by Omani Arabs who controlled the Zanzibar slave trade and, later, European slave-traders led to Sakalava slave raiding operations and control over the major ports of the north and northwest region of Madagascar. Initially, the Arabs exclusively supplied weapons to the Sakalava in exchange for slaves. These slaves were obtained from slave raids to Comoros and other coastal settlements of Madagascar, as well as from merchant ships from the Swahili coast. The Sakalava kingdom quickly subjugated the neighbouring territories of the Mahafaly people, starting with the southern ones.

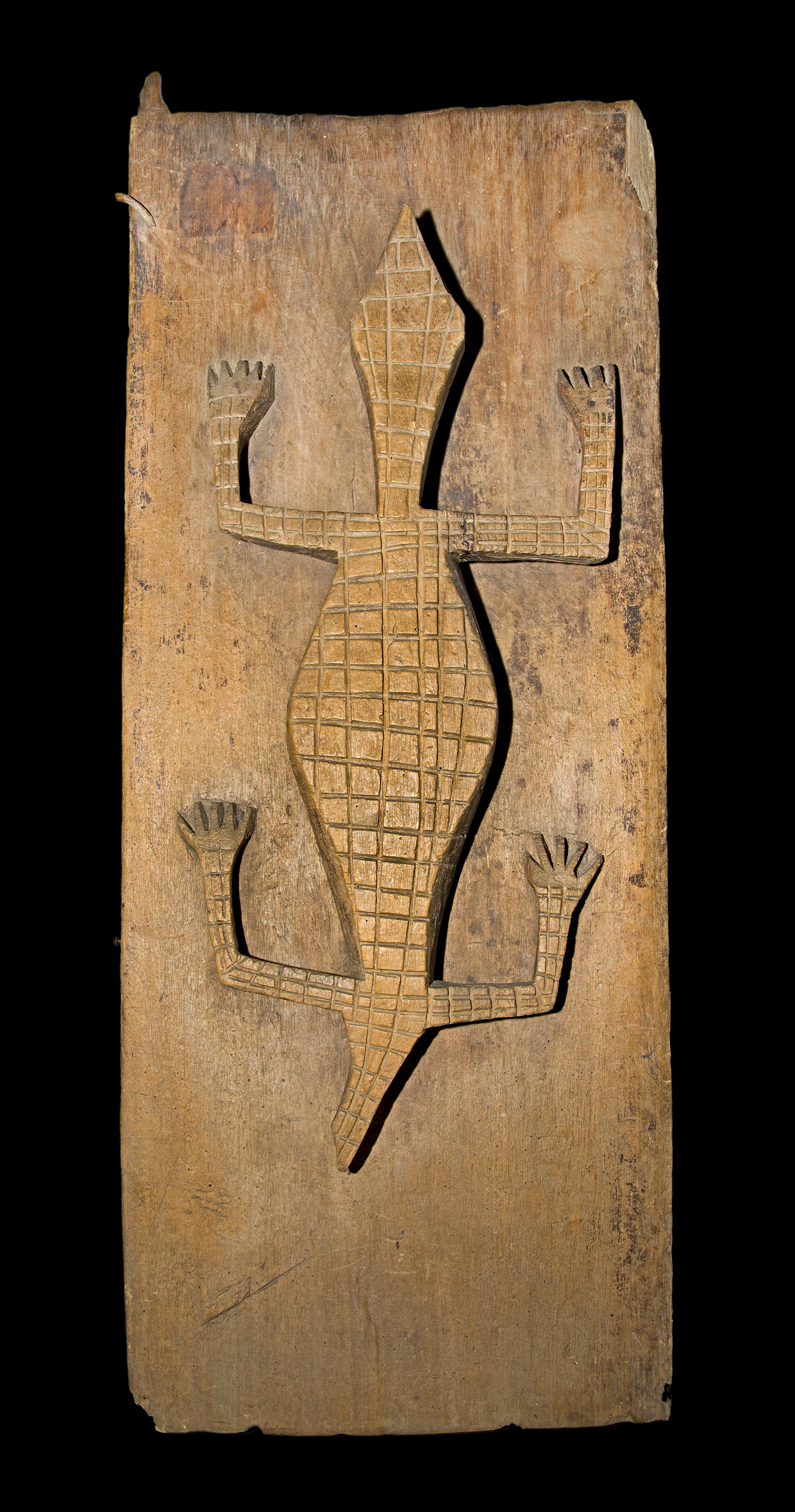
Door with a carved crocodile, exhibited at the World Exhibition in Paris in 1900.

Merina oral histories and documents in Comoros mention a series of annual expeditions by Sakalava slave raiders against their villages through the end of the 18th century. These expeditions were aided by guns obtained from the Arabs, a weapon that both Comoros and the Merina lacked. The largest and one of the most favored ports for the slave trade on Madagascar was the Sakalava coastal town of Mahajanga. The Sakalava had a monopoly over the slave trade in Madagascar till the end of the 18th century. Although smaller by population, their weapons permitted them wide reach and power, allowing them to force other, more populous ethnic groups to pay tribute to them in the eighteenth century.

The Merina king Radama I bought guns in late 18th century and launched a war against the Sakalava Kingdom, which ended its hegemony and slave raids. The Merina Kingdom then reversed the historical enslavement their people had faced, becoming suppliers for the slave trade. Though the Merina were never to annex the two last Sakalava strongholds of Menabe and Boina (Mahajanga), the Sakalava never again posed a threat to the central highlands, which remained under Merina control until the French conquest of the island, a century later, in 1896.

== Kings and queens ==
The dynasty Zafimbolamena Belihisafra.

- Andriandahifotsy (1600–1680)
- Andriamandisoarivo, Tsimanatatona, Mizana (between 1680 and 1712)
- Andriamboeniarivo, Andriantonkafo (between 1712 and 1722)

After the reign of Andriantonkafo the kingdom was split into two entities:

- One reigned by Andramahatindriarivo (1722–1742) and the other by Andrianahevenarivo (1733– ?)

Andramahatindriarivo was succeeded by

- Ndramanihatinarivo (1742–1749) and
- Ndramarofaly (1749–1780).
- Ravahiny or Andriavahiny (1780–1808)
- Tsimaloma (1808–1822)
- Andriantsoly, Andriamanava-Karivo (1822–1824). Deposed 1824 by Radama I after the fall of Mahajanga, from 1832 to 1843 he was exiled and reigned in Mayotte. He attempted to take back control after Radama's death, but lost to Queen Ranavalona I and returned to Comoros again. He signed the Annexation of Mayotte by France in 1841.
- Oantitsy, the sister of Andriantsoly, became queen from 1832 to 1836
- Tsiomeko, her daughter, followed from 1832 to 1843 (†in Nosy Be) but had to seek refuge on Nosy Be in 1837.

In 1841 the islands of Nosy Be and Nosy Komba became a French Protectorate.

- Andriamamalikiarivo (Fitahiana). She had a son with Dormoamy of Beramanja who was her prime minister, called:
- Rano, also named Andriamanintrana
- Ndriananetry, who gave birth to
- Tandroka, Ndramamahagna, who later became governor of Analalava. He fathered Soazara and Ndriantahira (or Ambilahikely of Analalava). When he died, his son 'Rano' was still young and the kingdom fell into anarchy.
- Safy Mozongo, later called Andriamandrambiarivo (1869–1879), the cousin of Tsiomeko. She was buried 1880 in Nosy Komba.
- Binao (1881–1923). Under her reign Madagascar became a French colony. She was evicted from her doany (royal palace) by her half-brother:
- Amada (1923–1968) but in parallel also Andriamamatatrarivo, who reigned during the same period, from 1923 to 1968.
- Fatoma, also called Andriamanaitriarivo, the brother of Amada, acceded to the throne in 1970.
- Amady Andriantsoly (*18 August 1933 Nosy-Be – †05 Mars 2011 at Nosy-Be), titled: Amada II, who was deposed in 1993.
- Soulaimana Andriantsoly (1993–present)

== Demographics ==
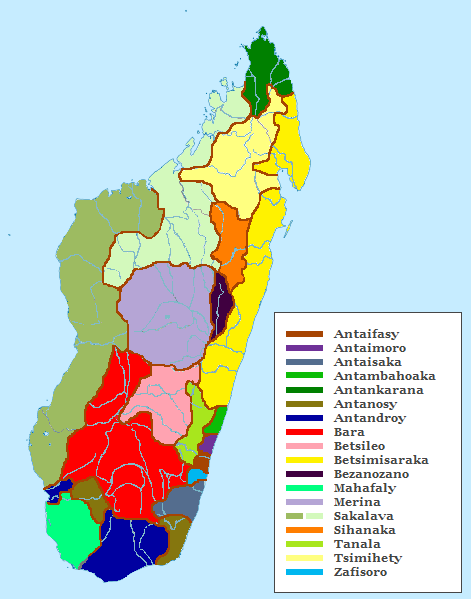
Distribution of Malagasy ethnic groups

The Sakalava consist of multiple smaller ethnic groups that once lived under the same empire and are unified under the same name. They have great diversity among its constituents, who continue to perpetuate distinct regional customs, both culturally and linguistically. The Sakalava are divided in two distinct groups:

- The Sakalava of Boina speaking a north malagasy dialect.
- The Sakalava of Menabe speaking a southern malagasy dialect.

The Sakalava people are widely distributed over about 128,000 square kilometers (ranging from the coast from Onilahy River in the southwest, to Nosy Be in the north). These people also raise the zebu cattle herds similar to those found in Africa, which are less common in other regions and interior of the island.

== Society and culture ==
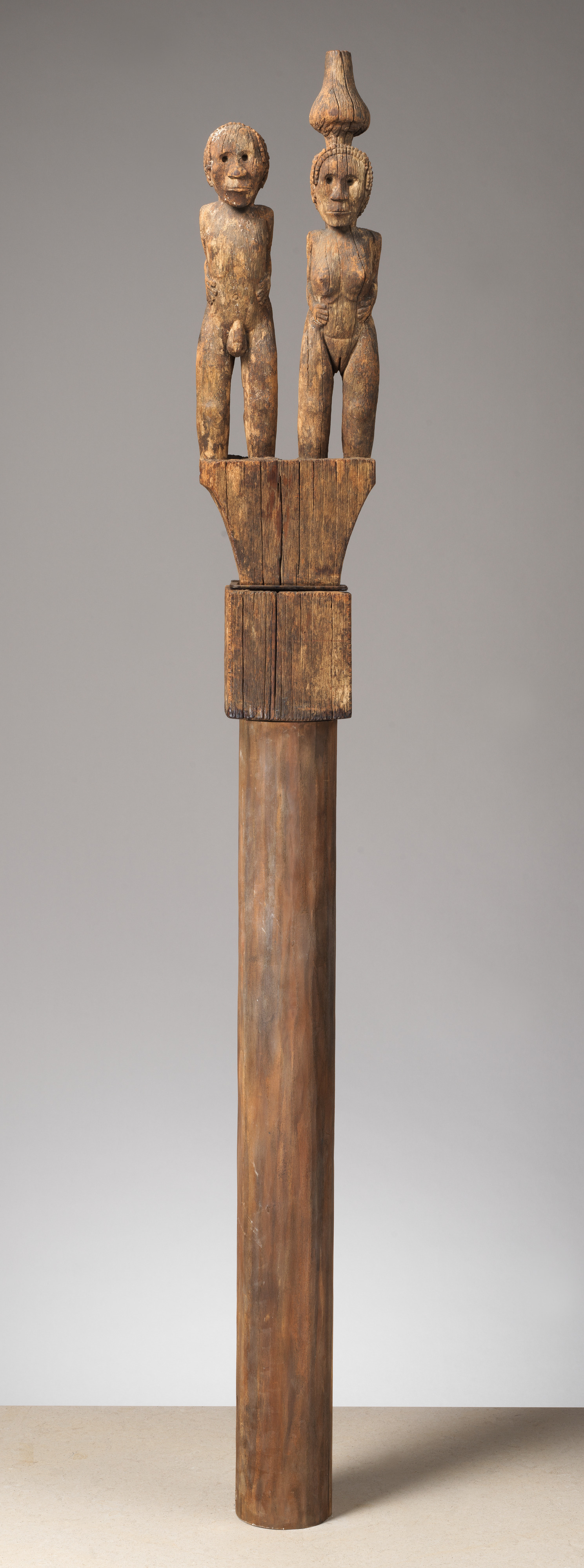
A couple carved on top of a "hazomanga", which is a wooden pole placed in honor of elders, made by a Sakalava artist (17th-18th century)

=== Religion ===
About 60% of the Sakalava follow Fomba Gasy, a traditional religion centered around royal ancestor worship aided by the noble dady lineage who preserved the remains of the deceased rulers. The dady priests conduct a ceremony called Tromba, where they divine the spirits of the dead ancestors and communicate their words back to the Sakalava people. The Sakalava will frequently visit memorial sites of royal ancestors to clean and maintain them. It's believed that the act of maintaining these sites keeps the memory of their ancestors alive, and also communicates to the ancestral spirits that the memory of them hasn't been lost. The spirits will get a devoted toñy, which is a tree or stone assigned to them in their honor.

A doany is a place of worship and contains shrines dedicated to royal ancestors. Located in the Tsararano quarter of the town of Mahajanga lies a sacred place called "the Doany of Mahajanga" (It's also referred to as "Doany Miarinarivo", "Doany Andriamisara", or "Donay Andriamisara Efadahy Manankasina"). It acts as a gravesite and doany for a group of royal ancestors called "The Blessed Four Brothers Andriamisara", who were well known members of the west coast dynasty. Here, visitors wait outside until they are guided to the shrines inside the doany by someone titled a guardian. The guardian will join the visitors in prayer, helping them summon the spirits of ancestors and communicating to them the visitors reasons for visiting. Often visitors will offer a sum of money along with their prayer, and in exchange, the guardian will present a small piece of limestone called a tanifoty; this is seen as a physical manifestation of the ancestor's blessing. To show that a blessing has been given, visitors will be marked by a white dot on their chest and then they're guided back outside the doany.

Tromba has been a historic feature of the Sakalava people, and has centered around ceremonies and processions for the spirits of their deceased royalty. The procession is more than a religious event: it has historically been a form of community celebration and identity affirmation. Tromba is also found among other ethnic groups in other parts of Madagascar, but it has had a long association with and support from the Sakalava royal dynasties, which mutually perpetuated the practice and associated importance.

Tromba is also practiced in other cultures outside of Madagascar. Andriantsoly, after he was exiled to Comoros, spread the practice of Tromba to the people of Mayotte. Andriantsoly (also called Andriamanavakarivo after his death) led Tromba in Mayotte, and his burial site was used as the main place for the practice. Tromba also spread farther to Tanzania when people from Comoros immigrated to Zanzibar, and it still plays a main role in the Comorian community there.

Sunni Islam arrived among the Sakalava from Arab traders. It was adopted by the rulers of the Sakalava people in the eighteenth century in order to gain the military support of the Omani and Zanzibar Sultanates as the influence of the Merina and European traders increased. A significant percentage of the Sakalava converted to Islam during the reign of Andriantsoly, while continuing traditional religious practices such as spirit worship.

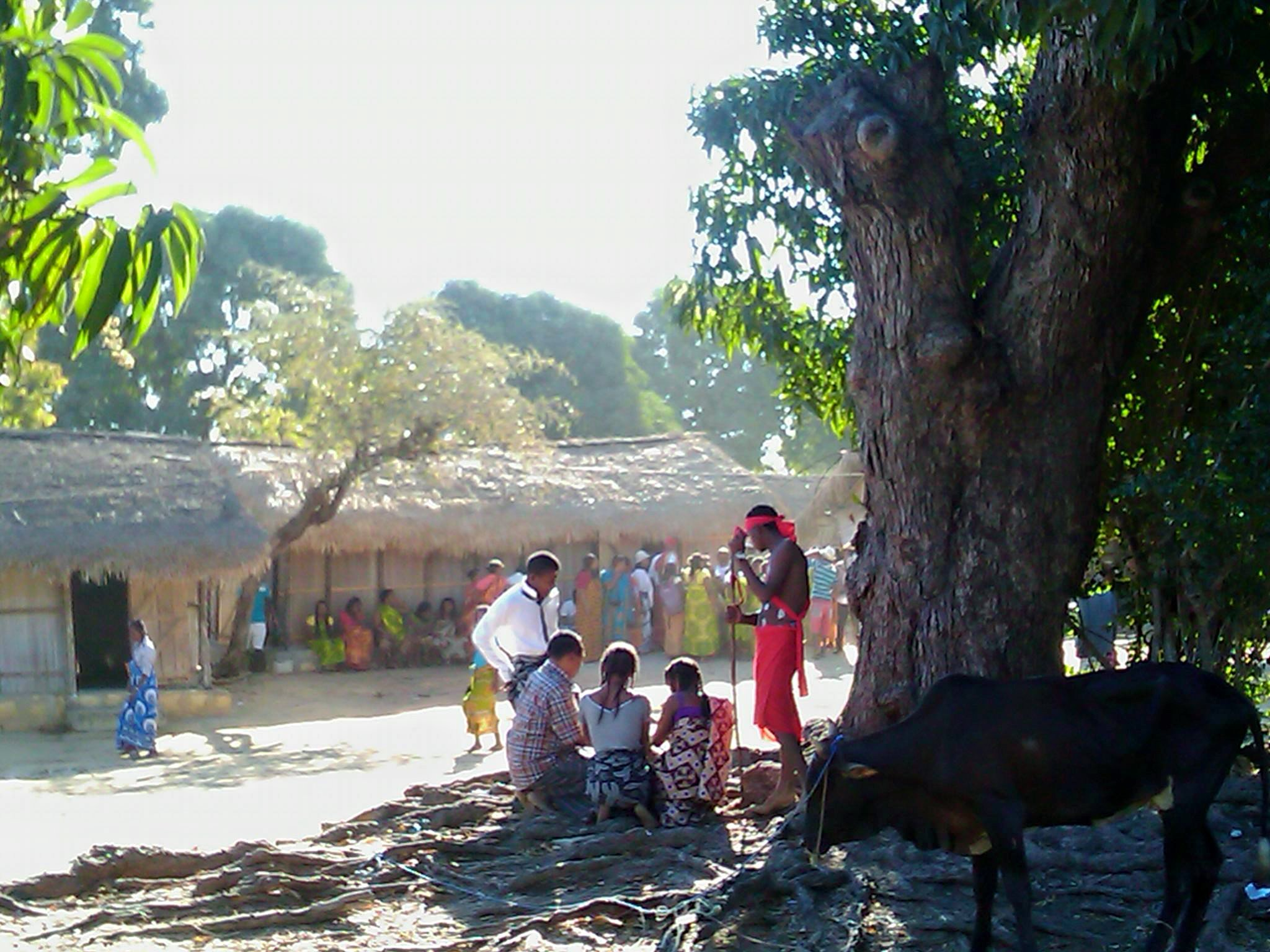
Tromba gathering in Madagascar.

Christianity is followed by about 35% of Sakalava, and arrived with European traders. In early 19th century, the Sakalava sought military support from European colonial powers in order to contain the reach of the Merina kingdom. The French, led by Captain Passot, arrived in Sakalava ports with Jesuit and other Catholic Christian missionaries. The island town of Nosy Be became their mission post, and by early 20th century numerous Catholic churches had been built in the Sakalava regions. Protestant missionaries have attempted to convert the Sakalava, but the animosity of Muslim Sakalava royalty towards the Protestant Merina nobility and the refusal of Sakalava to abandon their traditional practices (particularly royal spirit worship and Tromba) has ensured a low rate of conversion. Protestant missionaries view ancestral possession as "demonic" and associated with Satan. Exorcists called fifohazana (also called mpiandry) undergo special training and will help remove spirits from the possessed.

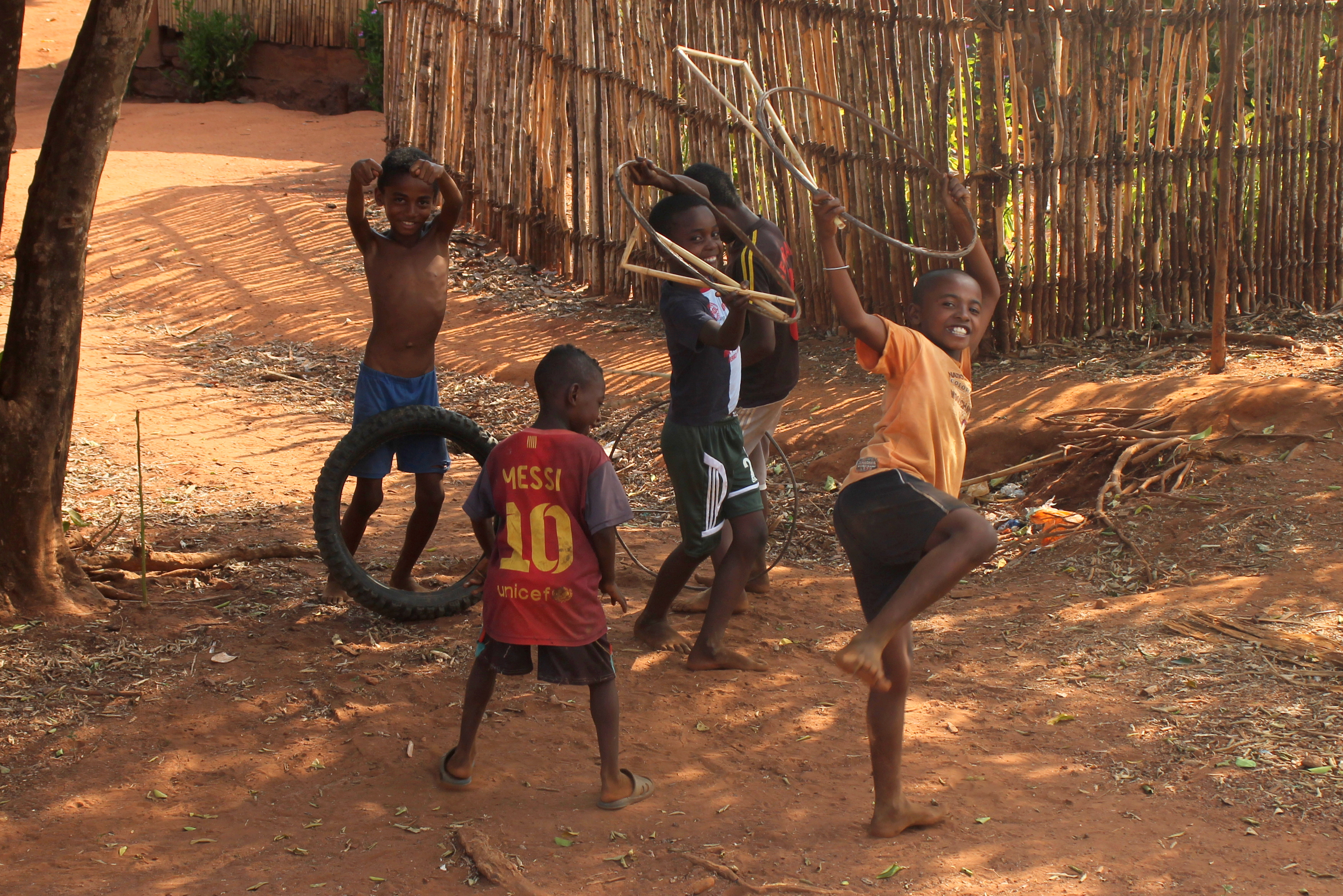
A group of Sakalava children

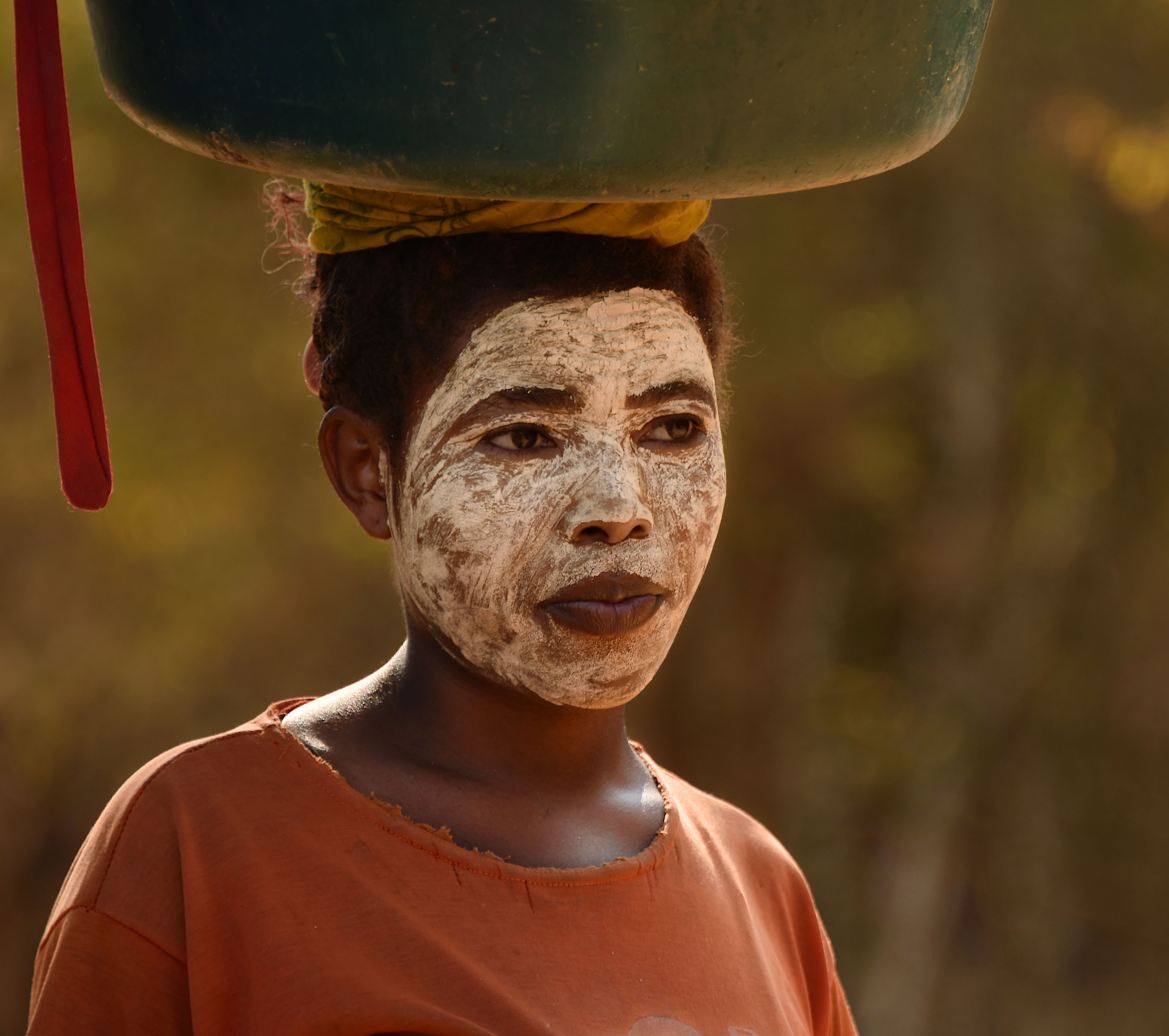
A Malagasy woman wearing masonjoany, a cosmetic paste ubiquitous among Sakalava women.

=== Social stratification ===
The Sakalava society became socially stratified, like many other ethnic groups, with the start of the slave trade. The Sakalava stratification system was hierarchical, based on the presumed purity of each stratum. In the Sakalava Kingdom, the strata included the Ampanzaka, or the royal caste, and the Makoa, or the descendants of African slaves.

The king is deemed as a sacred individual in Sakalava kingdoms. The king has to learn to harness a force called hasina in order to keep their position as ruler. Hasina is believed to be a very helpful force, but can be harmful if handled wrong; it's also used to maintain soil fertility. After a king passes, their spirit will become an ancestor and can possess mediums known as the saha during Tromba.

However, the hasina(or hasy in Sakalava dialect) is often related to specific abilities such as the faculties of healing and foretelling the future which the Sakalava high priests were believed to possess. The latter are qualified as to masina or masim-bava. The Sakalava priest communicates with God through his knowledge(the hasy) which surpasses that of all others just as the king does so through his dynastic lineage; their opposition is symbolized by the gold and the silver. Gold stands in opposition to silver, just as the king’s power stands in opposition to the power of knowledge (the Hasy) possessed by the “ombiasy”, and just as the eldest son stands in opposition to the youngest one. Yet, in specific moments in history, a Volafotsy could sometimes seize political power, as was likely the case with king Andriamisara.

=== Livelihood ===
The Sakalava have been pastoralists with large zebu cattle herds, traditionally allowed to graze freely over the grasslands in their northwest region. Unlike the Merina and Betsileo people of the interior who became highly productive rice farmers, the coastal and valley regions of the Sakalava have historically had limited agriculture. However, in contemporary Madagascar, migrants have expanded farms and agriculture into the northwestern provinces.

== Notable Sakalava ==
- Eusèbe Jaojoby, singer known as the King of Salegy, is a Malagasy of Sakalava ethnicity.

== See also ==
- Fitampoha
- Malagasy People

== Bibliography ==
- Portions of this article were translated from fr:Sakalava
- Bradt, Hilary; Austin, Daniel (2007). Madagascar (9th ed.). Guilford, CT: The Globe Pequot Press Inc. pp. 113–115. ISBN 978-1-84162-197-5.
- Diagram Group (2013). Encyclopedia of African Peoples. San Francisco, CA: Routledge. ISBN 9781135963415.
- Ogot, Bethwell A. (1992). Africa from the Sixteenth to the Eighteenth Century. Paris: UNESCO. ISBN 9789231017117.
- Goedefroit, Sophie (1998). À l'ouest de Madagascar - les Sakalava du Menabe. IRD Editions. ISBN 2-7099-1386-0.
