= Fady (taboo) =

Cultural prohibition in Malagasy culture

In Malagasy culture, fady (Malagasy pronunciation: [ˈfadʲ]) are a wide range of cultural prohibitions or taboos. People, places, actions or objects may be the subject of fady, which vary by region within Madagascar. The taboos are believed to be enforced by supernatural powers, and are particularly connected with Malagasy ancestor worship.

Although some are held nationwide, others may be particular to regions, villages or even individual families. Not all fady are still heeded, especially in areas where Christianity's influence is most pervasive, such as Imerina. Fady are an integral part of Malagasy identity and play an important part in community and identity formation. The word is a descendant of Proto-Austronesian *paliSi (compare with Sundanese pamali, Old Javanese pali-pali).

Common prohibitions include those against pointing at a tomb, against the eating of eels by pregnant women and, for onlookers, against describing a newborn baby as ugly. New fady are created constantly. When a new initiative or business is started, a ritual offering (joro) must be made to prove that it is not fady. Those who break a fady (ota fady in the infinitive) are shunned as unclean (maloto) and for endangering the community's spiritual balance, regardless of whether or not the infraction was deliberate. Foreigners in Madagascar are advised to respect local fady and alter their behaviour accordingly. Foreign travel advice published by the British government informs:

In many parts of Madagascar, aspects of daily life are regulated by taboos, known as 'fady'. These vary from one region to another. Fady can range from forbidden foods to restrictions on clothing. If you plan to visit remote rural areas, get advice from your tour operator or a local guide. They can advise you about how to behave in certain locations. If you plan a longer stay in a village, first check if you should inform the head of the local authority ('Fokontany') and the village head or wise man ('Ray aman-dreny').

Fady also form an important influence in other aspects of Malagasy culture. The Malagasy for "please" or "excuse me" is azafady, literally translating as "may it not be fady of me".

Some writers have argued that fady are conceptually similar to unwritten social taboos in western culture, in which disregard can lead to the violator being shunned by the community.

== List of fady ==
- A pig with a curling tail brings poverty on his owner
- When building a house, it must face west
- Vazaha (foreign) guests must not ask the name of their host, or of their village, while staying with them
- For guests to offer money to hosts is fady

=== Razana (ancestor) worship ===
- No tomb must be built at the end of a valley
- No tomb must be built within eyeshot of a village
- The construction of a tomb must take more than one year
- A tomb door must face west, but not due west, to avoid giving it the same vintana (destiny) as the family home: "because the dead have a stronger vintana than the living, a shared alignment would put them in a dangerously powerful position"
- A dog who urinates near a tomb must be killed immediately. A human who accidentally does the same must be fined one zebu, to be sacrificed at once at the site of the offence
- To point at a tomb is fady, and "anyone who accidentally does so must count their fingers aloud, from one to ten, beginning with a little finger and simultaneously spitting on each fingertip while saying, 'My hand is not leprous, it is not leprous'
- A tomb-site must be positioned south-east or south-west of the village. An ombiasa (healer-diviner) must advise on the right place

== Footnotes ==
=== Bibliography ===
- Dahl, Øyvind (1999). Meanings in Madagascar: Cases of Intercultural Communication (1st ed.). Westport: Bergin & Garvey. ISBN 9780897896429.
- "Foreign Travel Advice: Madagascar, safety and security". Gov.uk. Foreign and Commonwealth Office.
- Murphy, Dervla (1985). Muddling Through in Madagascar. London: John Murray. ISBN 0-7195-4239-1.
- Tyson, Peter (2013). Madagascar, the Eighth Continent: Life, Death and Discovery in a Lost World (Rev. ed.). Chalfont St. Peter: Bradt. ISBN 978-1-84162-441-9.
