= Andriamahilala =

First woman in Malagasy mythology

Andriamahilala is the first woman in Malagasy mythology. She is associated with the moon.

== History ==
Zanahary saw that Andriamahilala and her husband Andriambahomanana had many children and their children had children. Death was needed. Zanahary asked what kind of death they wanted. Andriambahomanana chose to die like the banana plant. On its death it puts forth new shoots. Andriamahilala choose to die like the moon, dying and being reborn every month.
