= Religion in Madagascar =

Religious beliefs of the people of Madagascar

Religion in Madagascar (Pew Research Center 2020)
1. Christianity (74.2%)
2. Unaffiliated (22.3%)
3. Islam (1.20%)
4. Other religions (2.20%)

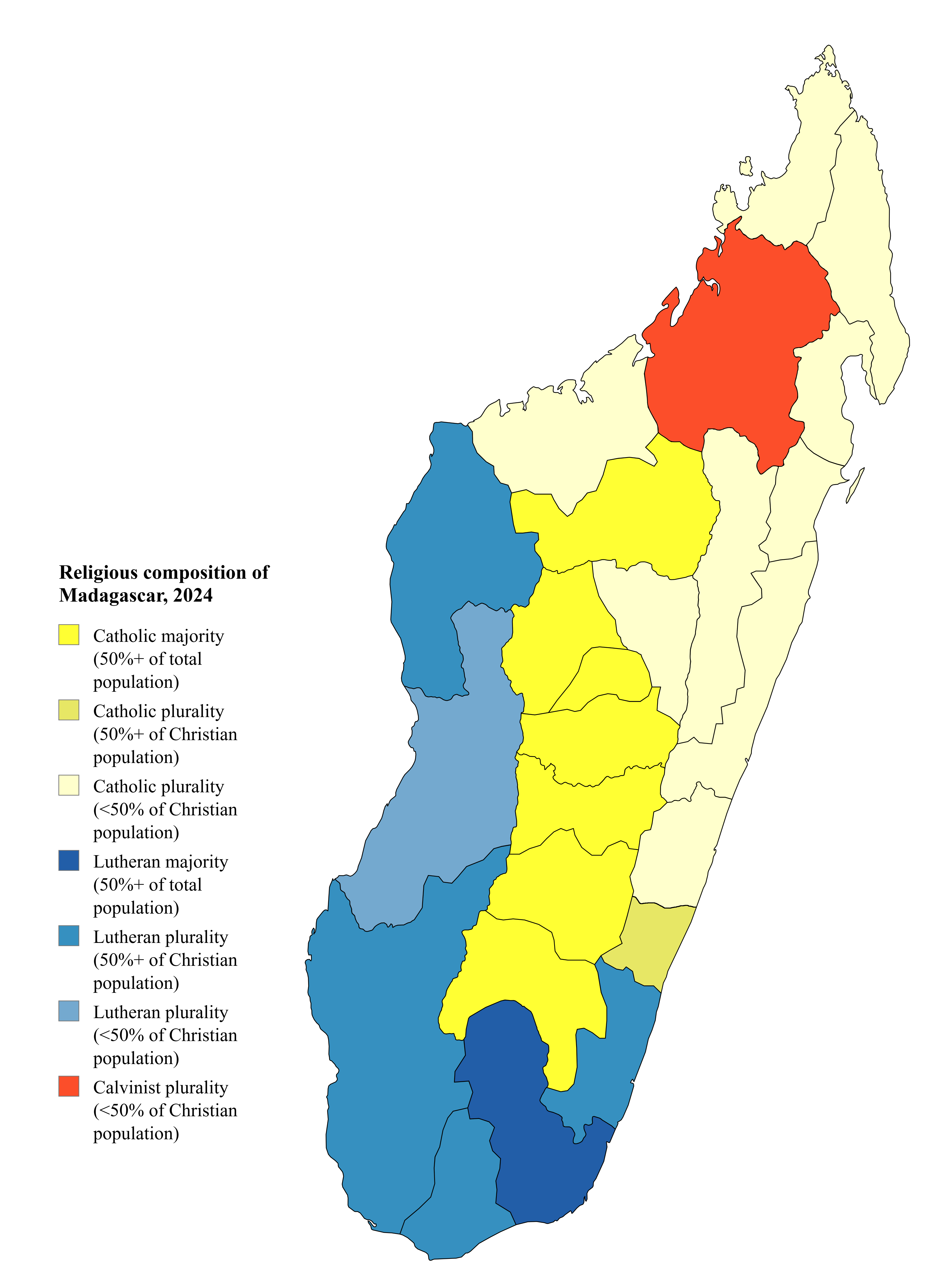
Largest denomination by province in Madagascar, 2024

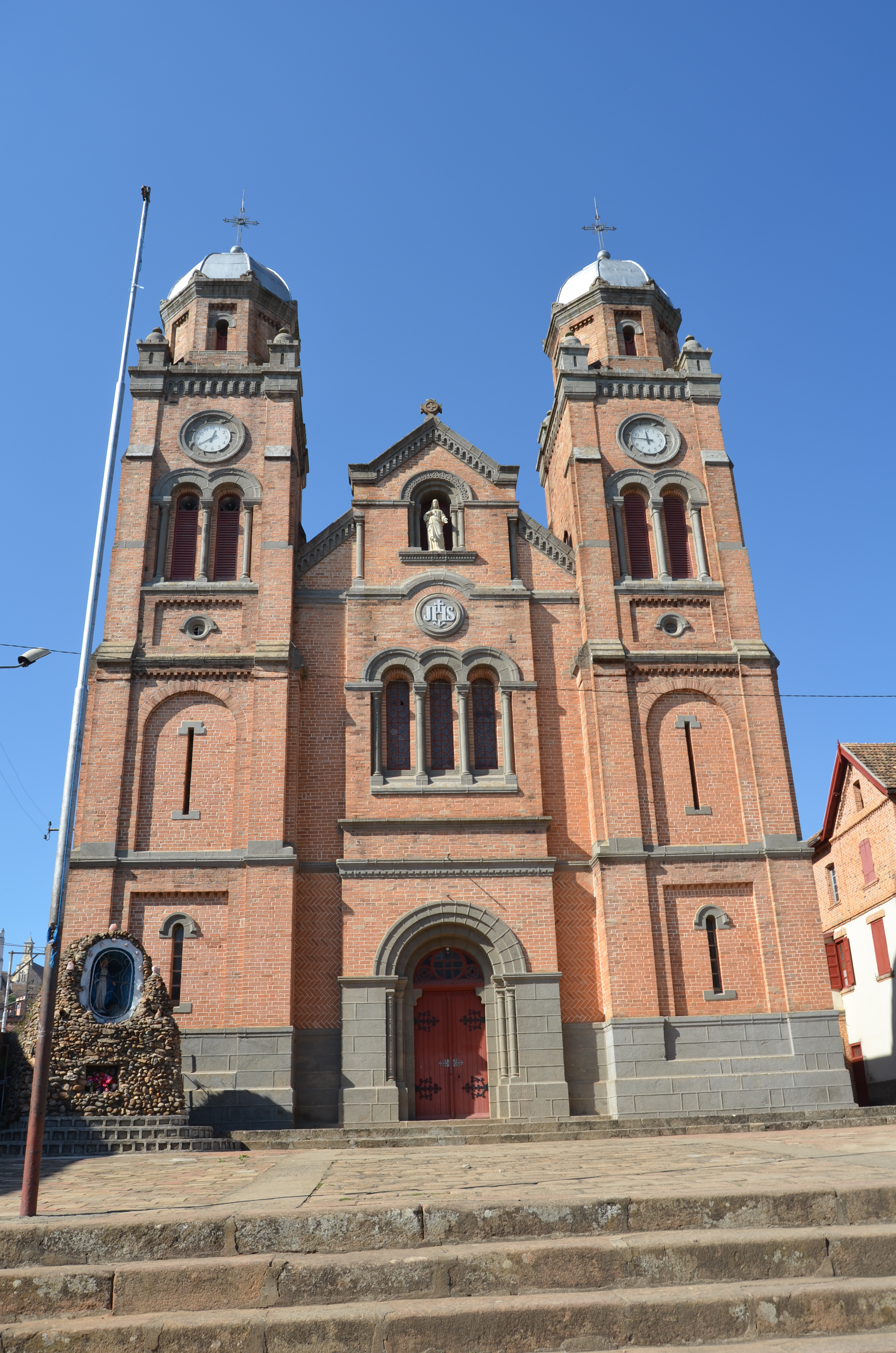
Holy Name of Jesus Cathedral, Fianarantsoa

Christianity is the largest religion in Madagascar, with Protestantism and Catholicism being its main denominations.

Madagascar is a secular state, and the nation's constitution provides for freedom of religious thought and expression and prohibits religious discrimination.

== Statistics ==
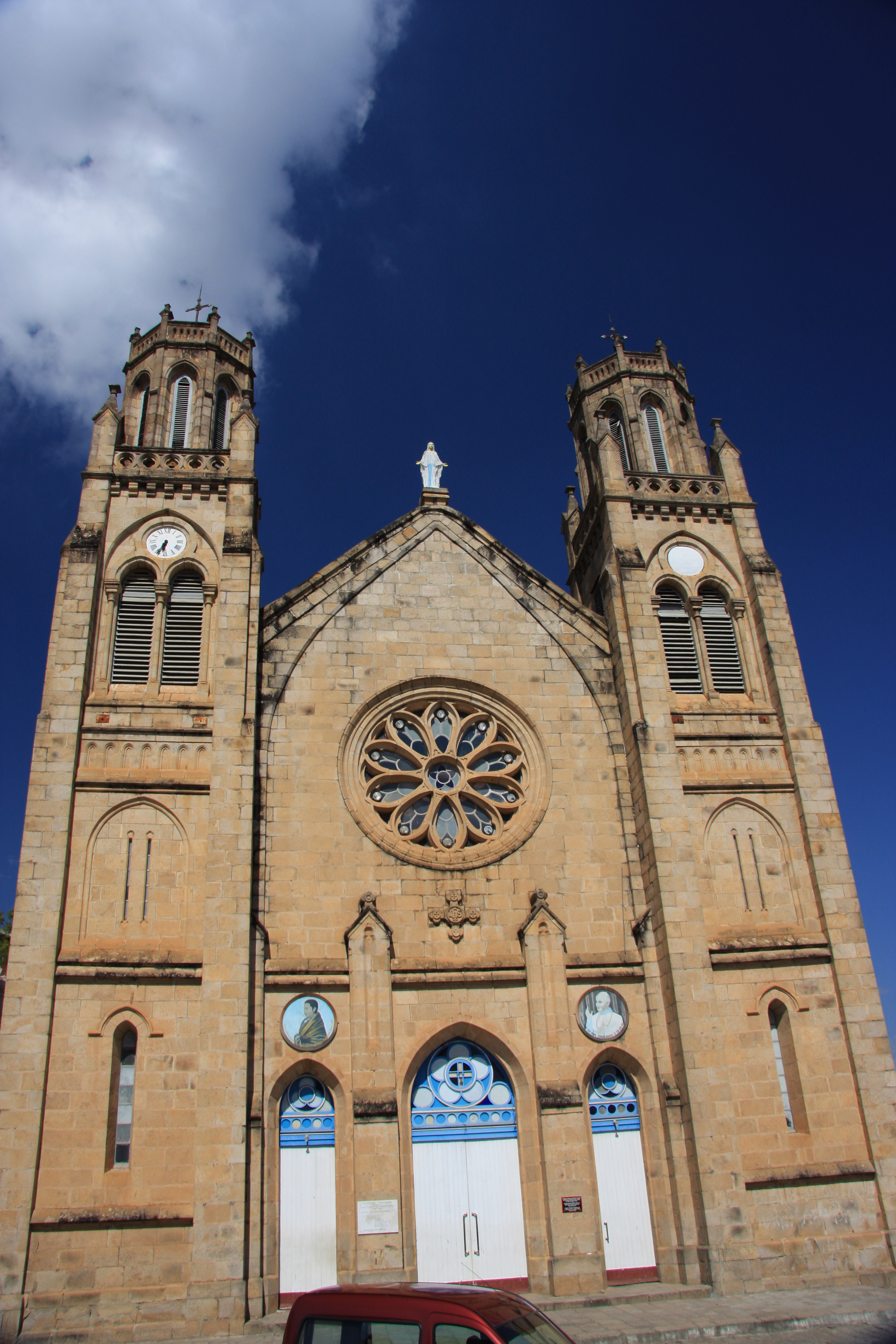
Cathedral of the Immaculate Conception in Antananarivo

According to the Pew Research Center in 2020, 85% of the population practiced Christianity, while just 4.5% of Malagasys practiced folk religions; among Christians, practitioners of Protestantism outnumbered adherents of Roman Catholicism. According to the Association of Religion Data Archives, 58.1% of the population is Christian, 2.1% is Muslim, 39.2% practices traditional faiths, while 0.6% of the population is non-religious or adheres to other faiths as of 2020.

== Legislation ==
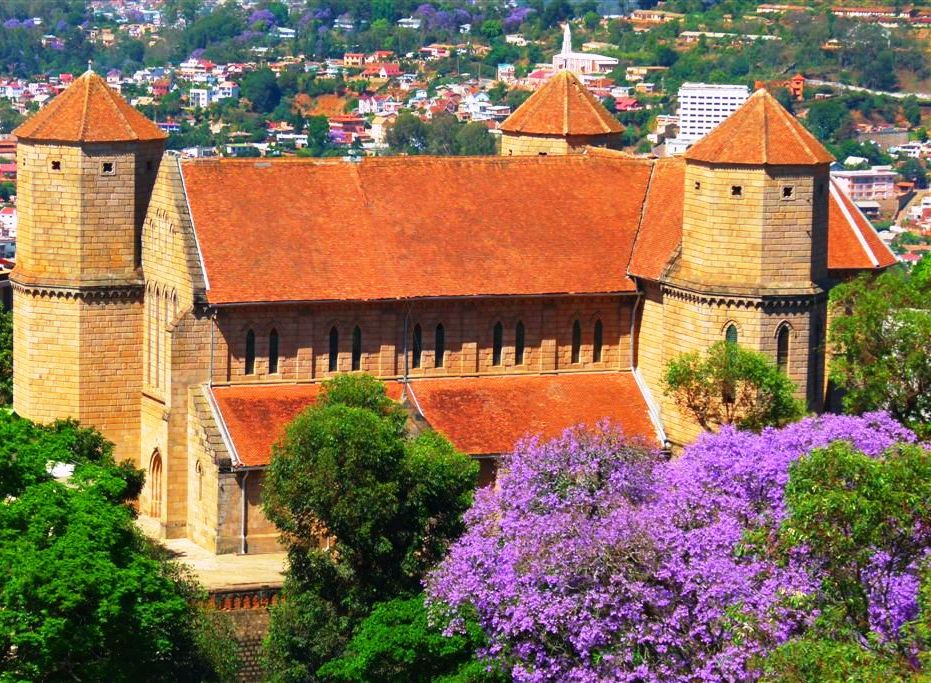
St. Lawrence Anglican Cathedral Ambohimanoro

The constitution of Madagascar provides for the freedoms of religious thought and expression and prohibits religious discrimination in the workplace. Other laws protect individual religious freedom against abuses by government or private actors.

Members of the Muslim community and adherents of some evangelical Protestant churches have reported that they have been denied admission into private schools and sometimes had limited access to employment due to their religious affiliation. Muslim community leaders have also criticized Madagascar's naturalization process as disproportionately barring Muslims from citizenship.

The government's inconsistent enforcement of labor laws, particularly the provision that workers are entitled to at least one 24-hour break from work per week, has led to workers sometimes being forced to miss religious services.

In April 2017 the minister of education threatened to close 16 Islamic schools he classified as “Quranic,” stating the schools were among 190 private schools identified as not complying with various administrative requirements. Representatives of the Muslim community criticized this declaration as Islamophobic.

== Christianity ==
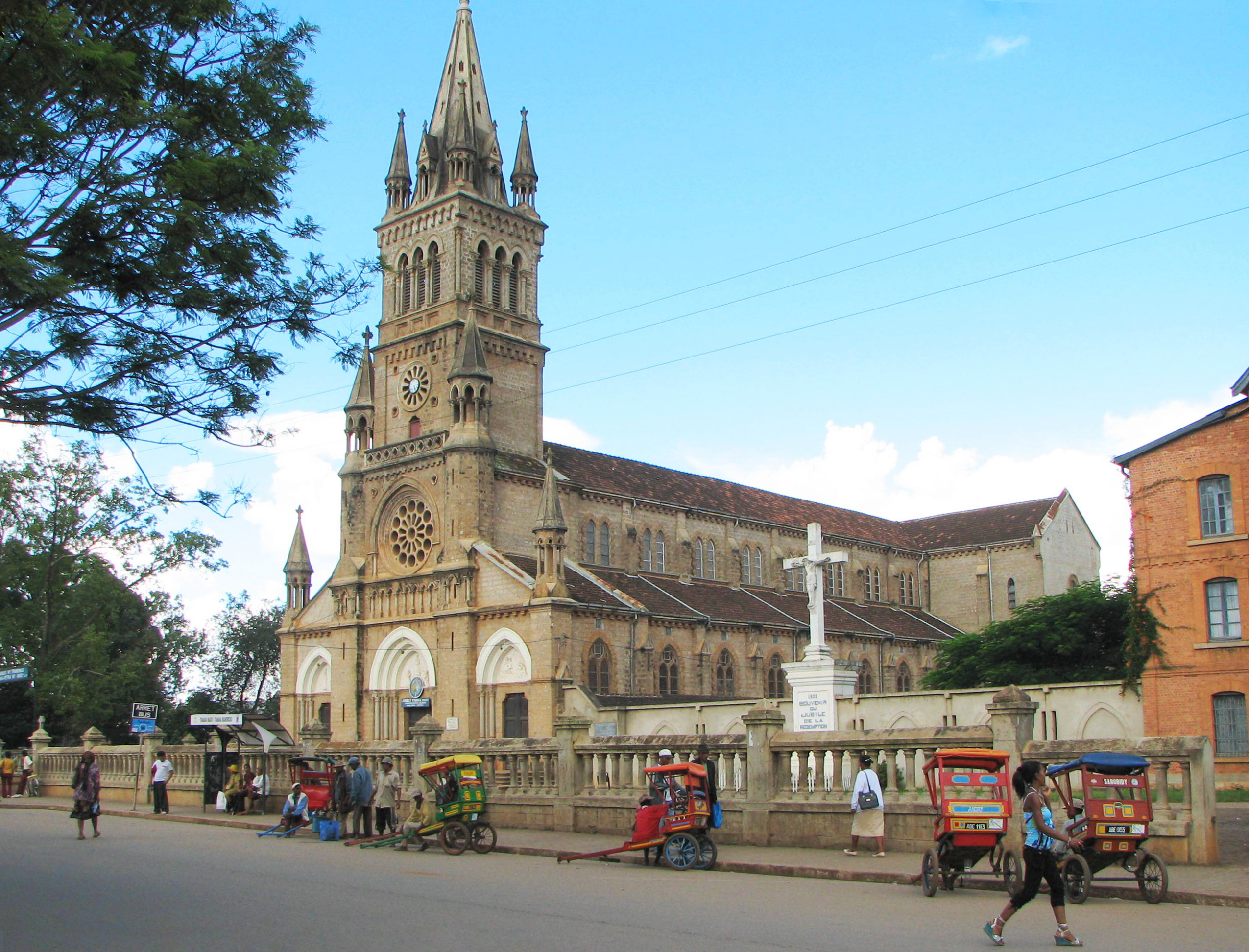
Our Lady of La Salette Cathedral, Antsirabe

Protestantism and Catholicism are the main Christian denominations in the country. The Malagasy Council of Churches comprises the four oldest and most prominent Christian denominations (Catholic, Church of Jesus Christ in Madagascar, Lutheran, and Anglican) and has been an influential force in Malagasy politics. In the disputed 2001 presidential elections, the council rallied behind Protestant candidate Ravalomanana, whose electoral slogan was "Don't be afraid, only believe."

The Church of Jesus Christ in Madagascar, a Reformed Protestant church, had 2.5 million adherents in 2004; former President Marc Ravalomanana served as its vice-president.

There were 21 Catholic dioceses in Madagascar in 2013, including five archdioceses.

== Other religions ==
=== Islam ===
Islam has been well established in what is now known as Madagascar for centuries and today Muslims represent 2 to 5 percent of the total population. The vast majority of Muslims in Madagascar practice Sunni Islam of the Shafi school of jurisprudence, with sizeable Shia and Ahmadiyya communities.

=== Hinduism ===
Hinduism in Madagascar began with the arrival of primarily Gujarati immigrants from the Saurashtra region of India as far back as 1870.

In 2023, only 0.06% of the population were Hindu.

In 2006, many of these are business owners, or informational technology professionals who have lived in the country for generations. The majority spoke Hindi or Gujarati, although some other Indian languages were spoken. Younger generations spoke at least three languages, including French or English, Gujarati and Malagasy.

=== Judaism ===
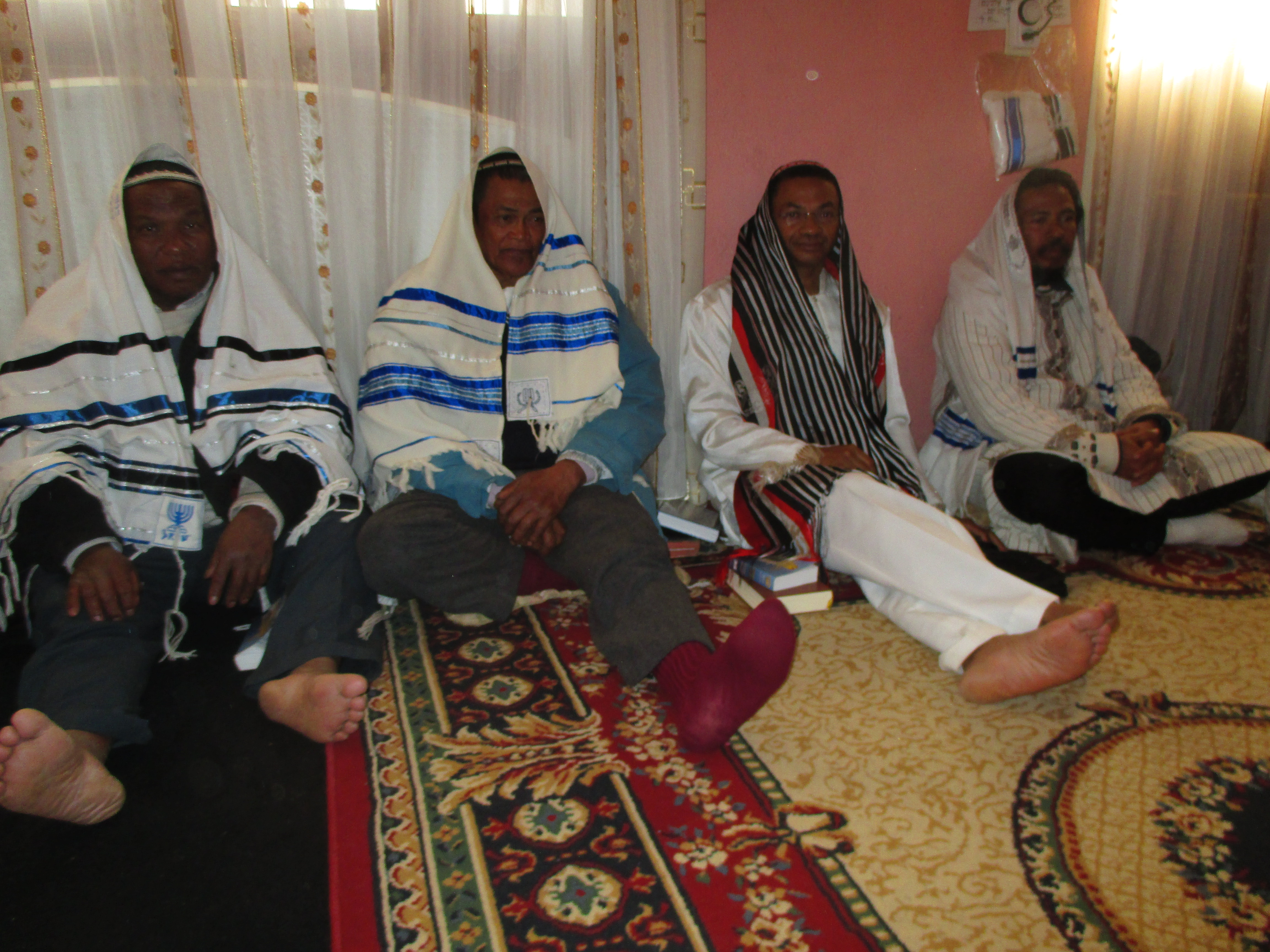
Leaders of Madagascar's rabbinic Jewish community in 2015

The island of Madagascar has a small Jewish population, but historically it has not been a significant center for Jewish settlement. Nevertheless, an enduring origin myth across numerous Malagasy ethnic groups suggests that the island's inhabitants descended from ancient Jews, and thus that the modern Malagasy and Jewish peoples share a racial affinity. This belief, termed the "Malagasy secret", is so widespread that some Malagasy refer to the island's people as the Diaspora Jiosy Gasy (Malagasy Jewish Diaspora). As a result, Jewish symbols, paraphernalia, and teachings have been integrated into the religious practices of certain Malagasy communities. The island's small rabbinic Jewish population is outnumbered by numerous mystical groups identifying as Jewish or Israelite and practicing syncretic combinations of Christianity, Judaism, Islam, and traditional ancestor worship and animism. These include the roughly 2,000 members of the "approximate[ly]... dozens" of Messianic Jewish congregations in Madagascar, which incorporate Judaic elements into Christian belief.

=== Baháʼí Faith ===
The Baháʼí Faith in Madagascar begins with the mention by ʻAbdu'l-Bahá, then head of the religion, who asked the followers of the Baháʼí Faith to travel to Madagascar. The first Baháʼí to pioneer to Madagascar arrived in 1953 and following native converts the first Baháʼí Local Spiritual Assembly was elected in 1955. By 1963 in addition to the one assembly there were groups of Baháʼís living in four other locations. In late July 1967 Rúhíyyih Khanum became the first Hand of the Cause to visit the country. In 1972 the Malagasy Baháʼís gathered to elect the first National Spiritual Assembly of the Baháʼís of Madagascar. By 2003 there were 33 local assemblies and the Association of Religion Data Archives in 2005 estimated there were about 17,900 Baháʼís in the country.

== See also ==
- Malagasy mythology
