= Andriambahomanana =

First man in Malagasy mythology

Andriambahomanana is the first man in Malagasy mythology.

Zanahary saw that Andriambahomanana and his wife Andriamahilala had many children and their children had children. Death was needed. Zanahary asked what kind of death they wanted. Andriambahomanana chose to die like the banana plant. On its death it puts forth new shoots. Andriamahilala chose to die like the moon, dying and being reborn every month.
