= Ratovantany =

Malagasy deity associated with creation myths

Ratovantany, also known as Andriantompo, is a self-creating Malagasy deity associated with the earth. He is most prominently featured in the Malagasy creation myths, where he makes a deal with the sky god Zanahary to create humanity; having crafted human beings from soil, Ratovantany reclaims the corpse upon death and decomposes it, while the soul belongs to Zanahary and thus the sky or the sun. Unlike Zanahary, Ratovantany appears to not have been a prominent deity to any Malagasy peoples, though this creation myth is ubiquitous in Malagasy cultures.
