= Andrianerinerina =

Mythical son of a Merina god (Madagascar)

According to one of several competing origin myths of the Merina people of Imerina in the central Highlands of Madagascar, Andrianerinerina is the incarnation of the son of God (Zanahary) from which the line of Merina rulers is said to have descended.

According to the legend, the son of Zanahary descended to Earth at a location named Anerinerina (north of Angavokely) – source of the sovereign's Earthly name – to play with the Vazimba (the original inhabitants of Madagascar according to Malagasy mythology). The Vazimba were specifically warned not to cook Andrianerinerina's sheep for him because he couldn't consume their flesh, but one was nonetheless butchered and cooked in a stew which was then served to him. By unwittingly eating the forbidden mutton, Andrianerinerina was no longer able to return to the heavens to rejoin his father. As a consequence, Zanahary gave the Vazimba a choice: to "untie the threads of their lives", or to accept Andrianerinerina as their lord and master. They chose to serve Andrianerinerina rather than be destroyed by Zanahary. Zanahary then sent down one of his daughters, Andriamanitra, to be a wife to Andrianerinerina, and they became the first two members of the royal line.
