= Mananjara =

- Location in Madagascar
- Coordinates: 18°45′S 47°16′E
- Country: Madagascar
- Region: Analamanga
- District: Ambohidratrimo

Area
  - Total: 25 km^{2} (9.7 sq mi)
- Elevation: 1,386 m (4,547 ft)

Population (2019)Census
  - Total: 4,117
- Time zone: UTC3 (EAT)
- Postal code: 105

Mananjara is a rural municipality in Analamanga Region, in the Central Highlands of Madagascar. It has a population of 4,117 in 2019. It is located in the East of Mahitsy and the National road 4. It has been connected to electricity since 2019.
