= Ampanotokana =

- Location in Madagascar
- Coordinates: 18°43′S 47°18′E
- Country: Madagascar
- Region: Analamanga
- District: Ambohidratrimo (district)

Area
  - Total: 135 km^{2} (52 sq mi)
- Highest elevation: 1,540 m (5,050 ft)
- Lowest elevation: 1,143 m (3,750 ft)

Population (2019)
  - Total: 21,969
  - Metro density: 158/km^{2} (410/sq mi)
- Time zone: UTC3 (EAT)

Ampanotokana is a town and commune in Madagascar. It belongs to the district of Ambohidratrimo (district), which is a part of Analamanga Region. The population of the commune was estimated to be approximately 21,969 in 2019.

It lies 35 km (22 mi) north-west of the capitol Antananarivo. Of the 29 fokontany (villages) of the commune, 11 lie along the RN 4 from Antananarivo to Mahajanga. The RNT 36 intersects in this town.

== Rivers ==
The Ikopa River is the southern limit of the commune.
