= Alakamisy Ambohimaha =

- Location in Madagascar
- Coordinates: 21°19′S 47°13′E
- Country: Madagascar
- Region: Haute Matsiatra
- District: Fianarantsoa II
- Elevation: 1,145 m (3,757 ft)

Population (2001)
  - Total: 22,000
- Time zone: UTC3 (EAT)
- Postal code: 303
- Climate: Cwb

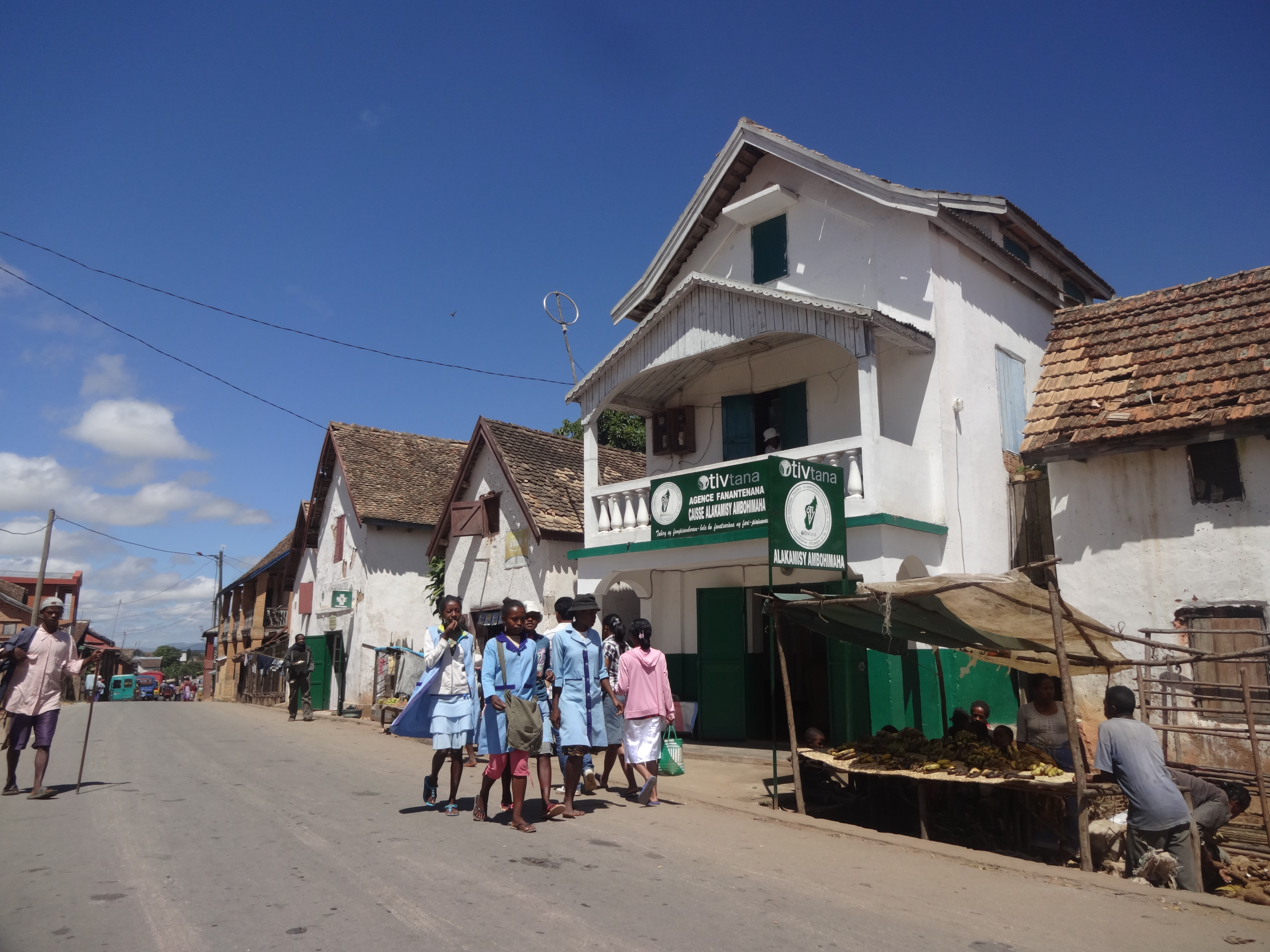
Alakamisy Ambohimaha

Alakamisy Ambohimaha is a rural commune in the Central Highlands of Madagascar. It belongs to the district of Fianarantsoa II, which is a part of Haute Matsiatra Region. The population of the commune was estimated to be approximately 22,000 in 2001 commune census.

In addition to primary schooling the town offers secondary education at both junior and senior levels. The majority 90% of the population of the commune are farmers, while an additional 2% receives their livelihood from raising livestock. The most important crops are rice and grapes, while other important agricultural products are beans, sweet potatoes and potatoes. Services provide employment for 8% of the population.

== Roads ==
It is situated on the National road 7, 25 km north of Fianarantsoa.
