= Malagasy mythology =

Malagasy mythology is rooted in oral history and has been transmitted by storytelling (angano, "story"), including the Ibonia cycle. At least 6% of Madagascar are adherents of the religion, which is known as Fomba Gasy, and surveys show it is likely at least half practice some aspects of it. Adherence to Fomba Gasy is high amongst the Sakalava people (up to 80%), as they are reluctant to convert to faiths of foreign origin.

Traditional mythology in Madagascar tells of a creator deity referred to as Zanahary, and the division of Heaven and Earth between Zanahary and his son, Andrianerinerina, a rebellious hero and frequent theme of their worship as the son of God, or between Zanahary and earth deities such as Ratovantany which crafted human bodies from clay; in these myths Zanahary gave life to humans, and their souls return to him on the sky or on the sun while their bodies return to the earth deities. In contrast to Andrianerinerina, the word Andriamanitra (the Merina term for "Fragrant Lord") is used to refer to revered ancestors. Malagasy cultures were generally polytheistic, and worshiped a variety of entities that straddled the line between god and revered ancestor.

== Role of ancestors ==
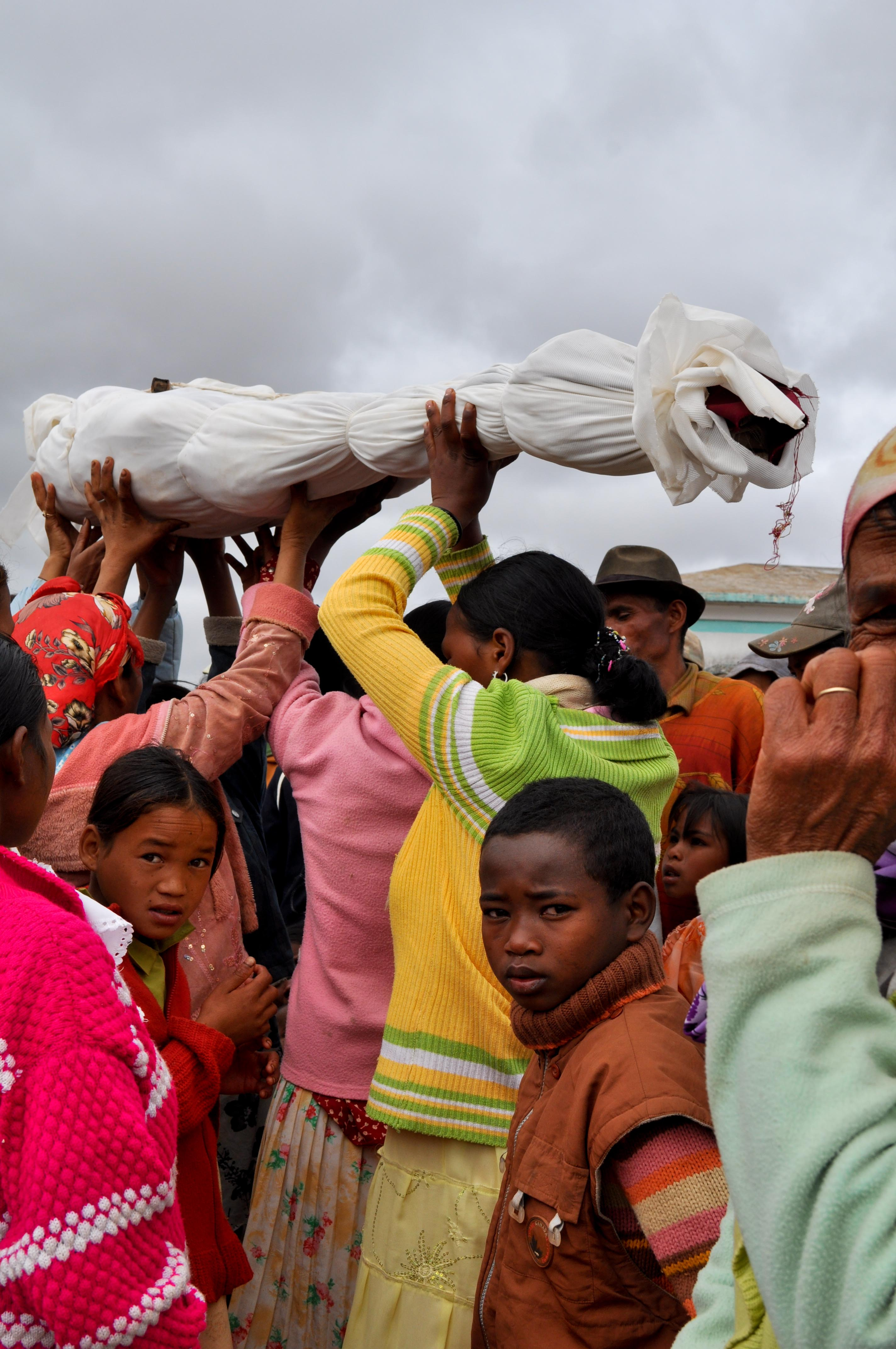
In traditional Malagasy culture, the famadihana burial tradition plays an integral role in spiritual life.

Ancestors are generally viewed as a benevolent force in the life of the living, but among some Malagasy it is believed that the spirits of ancestors may become angatra (ghosts of the dead) if they are ignored or abused. Angatra are believed to haunt their own graves and bring disease and misfortune to those living who offended them. A particular type of angatra is the kinoly: beings which look like people but have red eyes and long fingernails and disembowel living people.

Rituals such as the famadihana—rewrapping the bodies of the dead every 5–10 years in fresh lamba (handmade cloth)—are believed by some to prevent kinoly due to the traditional association of the lamba with hasina, the mystical and sacred life force. Beliefs relating to the powers and activities of the ancestors vary greatly from community to community within Madagascar.

=== Fady (cultural taboos) ===
The declarations or actions of ancestors are often the source of fady (taboos) that shape the social life of Malagasy communities. Across Madagascar, lemurs are often revered and protected by fady. In all of the origin myths of the Indri (in Betsimisaraka dialect: Babakoto), there is some connection of the lemur with humanity, usually through common ancestry. There are numerous accounts of the origin of the Indri in particular, but all characterize lemurs as sacred, and not to be hunted or harmed.

== Vazimba veneration ==
Malagasy mythology portrays a pygmy-like people called the Vazimba as the original inhabitants. Some Malagasy believe that these original inhabitants still live in the deepest recesses of the forest. In certain communities (and particularly in the Highlands), the practice of veneration of the dead can extend back to veneration of the Vazimba as the most ancient of ancestors. The kings of some Malagasy tribes claim a blood kinship to the Vazimba, including the Merina dynasty that eventually ruled over all of Madagascar. The Merina claim Vazimba ancestry through the royal line's founder, King Andriamanelo, whose mother, Queen Rafohy, was of the Vazimba.

== List of mythological figures ==
- Zanahary: The creator sky deity and generally most revered deity. Breathed life into beings, and their essence returns to him to the heavens upon death.
- Andrianerinerina: The son of Zanahary, folk hero and ancestor of the royal line.
- Andriambahomanana: The first man, and a lunar deity.
- Mahaka and Kotofetsy: A pair of trickster deities.
- Ratovantany: Creator earth god. Shaped the physical bodies of beings, and claims their remains upon death.
- Rapeto: An earth deity/mythical hero credited with shaping the land.

== Folklore ==
- Hainteny
- Kalanoro
- King Ravohimena and the Magic Grains

== Selected literature ==
- Bonnefoy, Yves;, Doniger, Wendy (1993). Asian Mythologies. University Of Chicago Press. pp. 187–201. ISBN 978-0-226-06456-7.
- Dandouau, A. (1922). Contes Populaires Des Sakalava Et Des Tsimihety.
- Ferrand, Gabriel. Contes populaires malgaches. Paris: Ernest Leroux, 1893.
- Haring, Lee (1980). "The Classification of Malagasy Narrative". Research in African Literatures. 11 (3): 342–355. JSTOR 3818280.
- Haring, Lee (1994). Ibonia: Epic of Madagascar. Bucknell University Press. ISBN 978-0-8387-5284-5.
- Haring, Lee (2009). "Verbal Charms in Malagasy Folktales". Charms, Charmers and Charming. pp. 246–259. doi:10.1057/9780230583535_17. ISBN 978-1-349-36250-9.
- Junior, James Sibree (1883). "The Oratory, Songs, Legends, and Folk-Tales of the Malagasy". The Folk-Lore Journal. 1 (1): 1–15. JSTOR 1252493.
- Junior, James Sibree (1883). "The Oratory, Songs, Legends, and Folk-Tales of the Malagasy [Continued]". The Folk-Lore Journal. 1 (2): 33–40. JSTOR 1252581.
- Junior, James Sibree (1883). "The Oratory, Songs, Legends, and Folk-Tales of the Malagasy [Continued]". The Folk-Lore Journal. 1 (3): 65–77. JSTOR 1252576.
- Junior, James Sibree (1883). "The Oratory, Songs, Legends, and Folk-Tales of the Malagasy [Continued]". The Folk-Lore Journal. 1 (4): 97–106. JSTOR 1252714.
- Junior, James Sibree (1883). "The Oratory, Songs, Legends, and Folk-Tales of the Malagasy. [Continued]". The Folk-Lore Journal. 1 (6): 169–174. JSTOR 1252670.
- Junior, James Sibree; Pickersgill, W. C. (1883). "The Oratory, Songs, Legends, and Folk-Tales of the Malagasy [Continued]". The Folk-Lore Journal. 1 (7): 201–211. JSTOR 1252662.
- Junior, James Sibree (1883). "The Oratory, Songs, Legends, and Folk-Tales of the Malagasy [Continued]". The Folk-Lore Journal. 1 (8): 233–243. JSTOR 1252626.
- Junior, James Sibree (1883). "The Oratory, Songs, Legends, and Folk-Tales of the Malagasy [Continued]". The Folk-Lore Journal. 1 (9): 273–279. JSTOR 1252792.
- Junior, James Sibree (1883). "The Oratory, Songs, Legends, and Folk-Tales of the Malagasy [Continued]". The Folk-Lore Journal. 1 (10): 305–316. JSTOR 1252772.
- Junior, James Sibree (1883). "The Oratory, Songs, Legends, and Folk-Tales of the Malagasy. [Concluded]". The Folk-Lore Journal. 1 (11): 337–343. JSTOR 1252722.
- De Longchamps, Jeanne. Conte Malgaches. Paris: Editions Erasme. 1955.
- McElroy, Colleen J. (1999). Over the Lip of the World: Among the Storytellers of Madagascar. ISBN 978-0-295-97824-6.
- Ottino, Paul (1982). "Myth and History: The Malagasy Andriambahoaka and the Indonesian Legacy". History in Africa. 9: 221–250. doi:10.2307/3171607. JSTOR 3171607. S2CID 161793408.
- Randriamanantena, Didier. Le Roi et Ifara (graphic novel retelling the legend of Razafimbolamena, the prodigal son).
- Renel, Charles. Contes de Madagascar. Paris: Ernest Leroux, 1910.
- Renel, Charles. Contes de Madagascar. Paris: Ernest Leroux, 1930.
- Tyson, Peter (2000). The Eighth Continent: Life, Death and Discovery in the Lost World of Madagascar. ISBN 978-0-380-97577-8.
