= Zanahary =

Sky deity in Malagasy mythology

Zanahary (also Andrianahary or Ndranan Ahary) is the personified sky and supreme deity of Malagasy mythology and folklore. He (usually male, but sometimes considered genderless) is considered a creator god, having collaborated with the earth god Ratovantany to create humanity; upon death, the soul migrates to the firmament, while the body returns to the earth. For this reason, Zanahary is closely associated with the soul in the indigenous theology as well as ancestor worship. He is a national god of the Merina people, and frequently henceforth appealed to by Malagasy nationalist groups; most notably Ranavalona I promoted the worship of this god over Christianity.

The Bara people and Betsimisaraka people possess a myth in which the role of Zanahary is taken by the personified sun, which accepts souls after death; however Zanahary is typically assumed to be devoid of solar characteristics. Similarly there is an "earth Zanahary" in contrast to the sky.

One missionary account records:

'ZANAHARY made us hands and feet. Then He went away and left us to ourselves. Far, far away in the impenetrable jungles of our eastern homeland, whence came our ancestors, is the dwelling place of the Creator. Only the jungle ancestors have permission to sit at His door, and speak to Him if He deigns to listen to them. We are afraid of Him.' Thus the Malagasy will answer when questioned about God.

— Andrew Burgess

== See also ==
- Atua
