= Ramilisonina =

Malagasy archaeologist

Ramilisonina is an archaeologist from Madagascar.

His work has focused on the prehistory of Madagascar, especially the period between the fifteenth and nineteenth centuries. His work with Mike Parker Pearson of the University of Sheffield has also contributed to the study of megalithic monuments in Europe. He conducted the first archaeological survey of Teniky.
