= Teniky =

Archaeological site in Madagascar

- Tenika
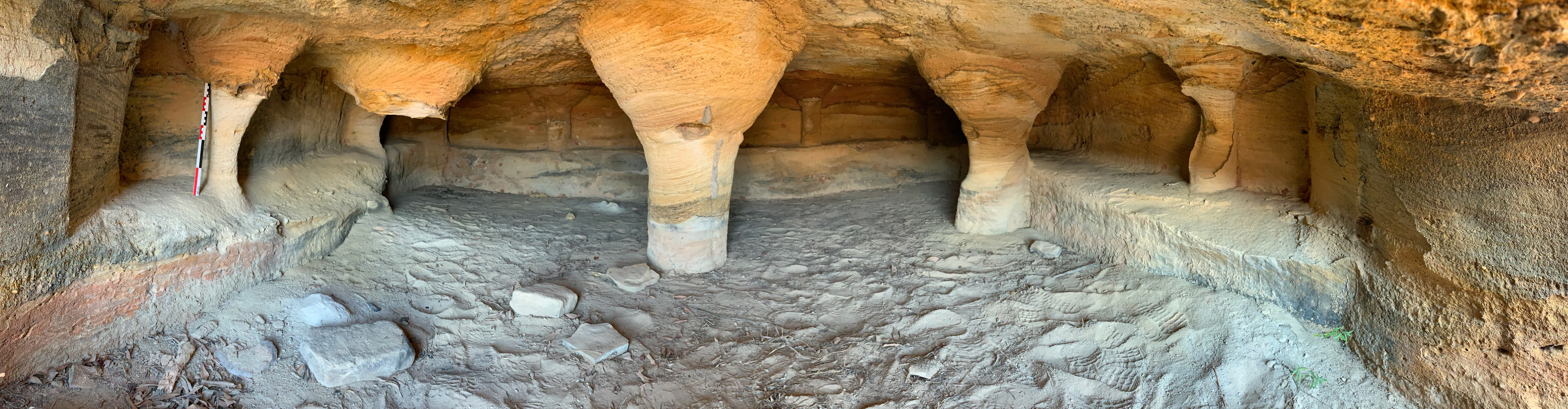
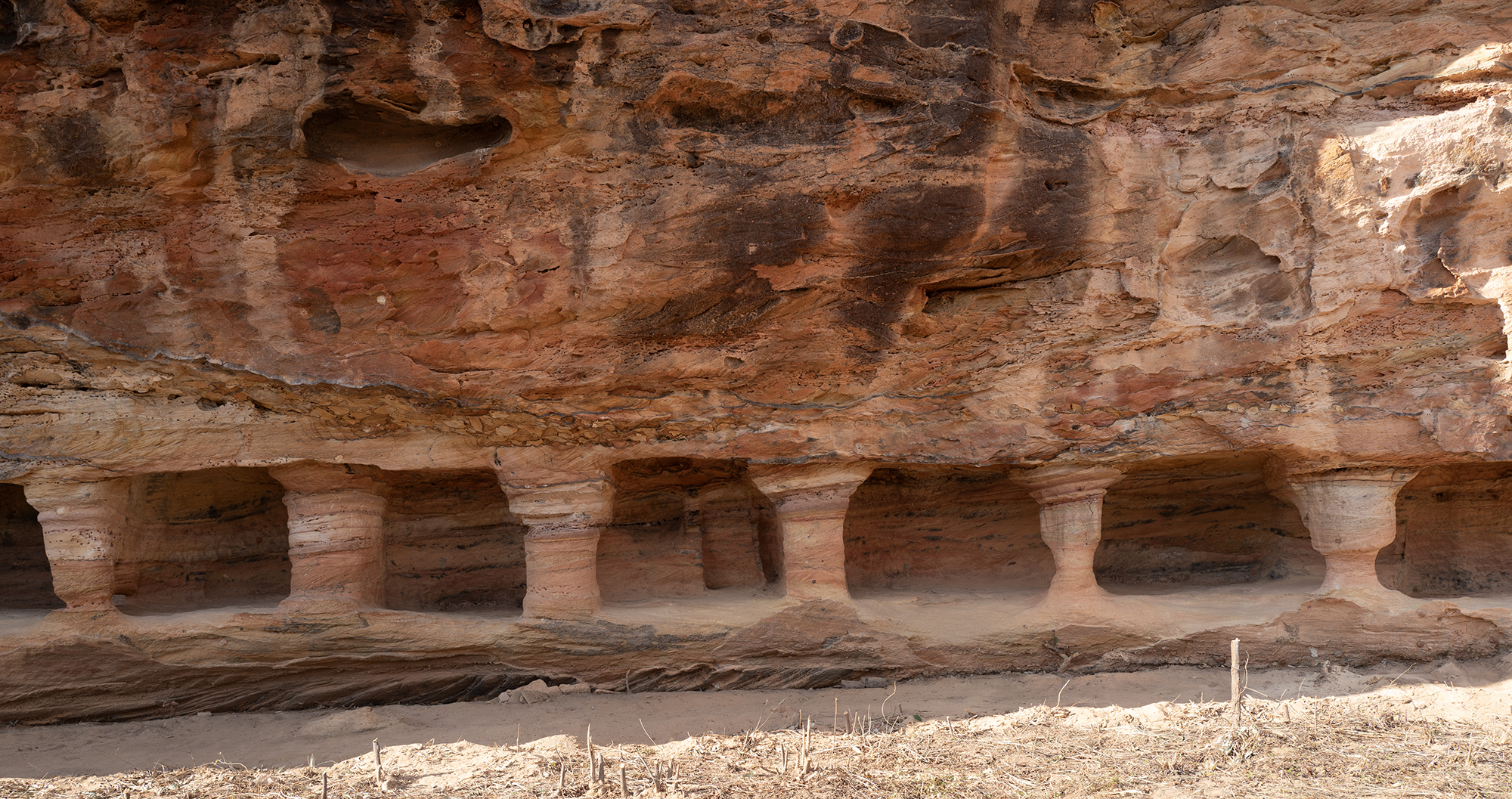
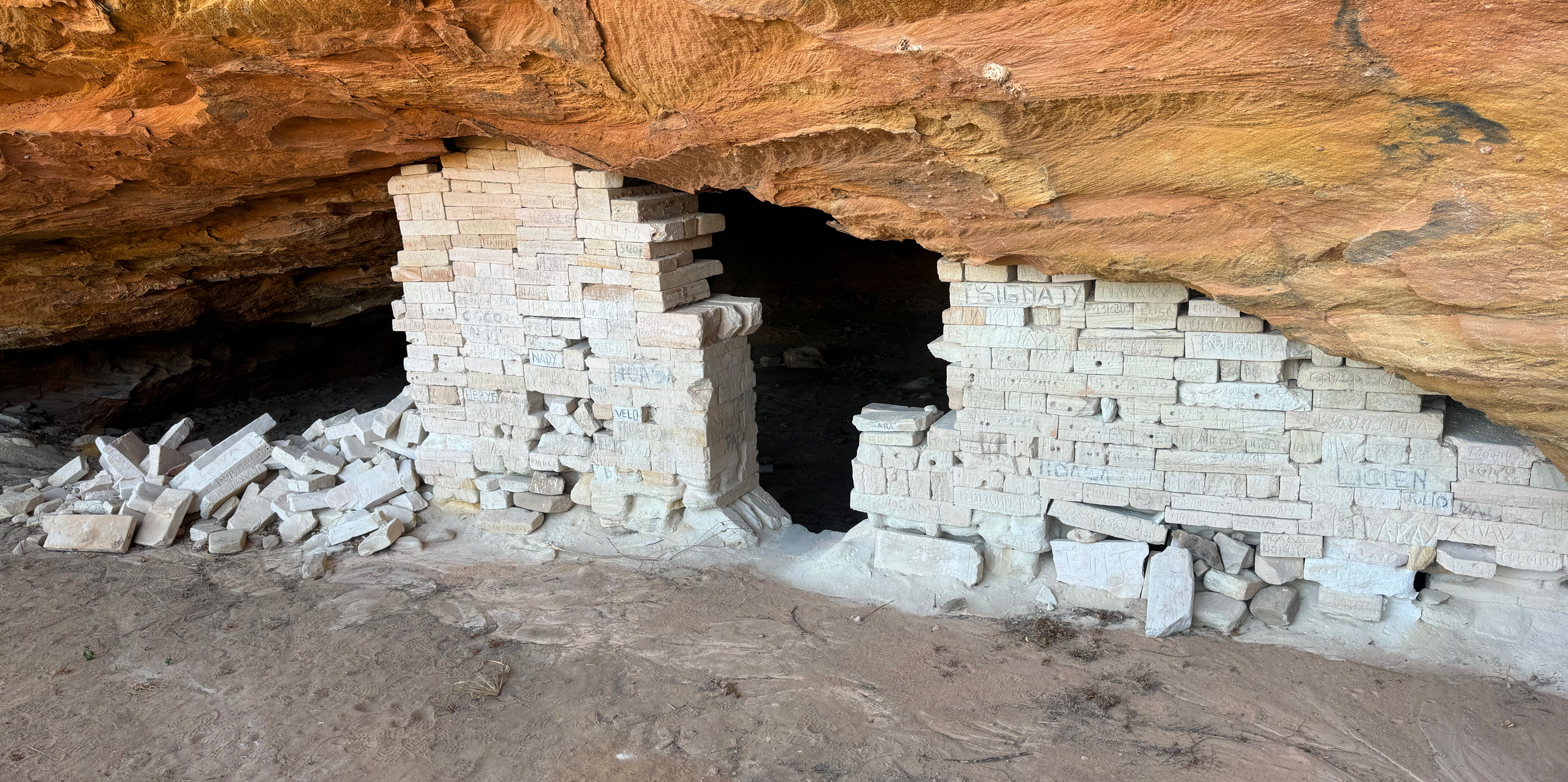
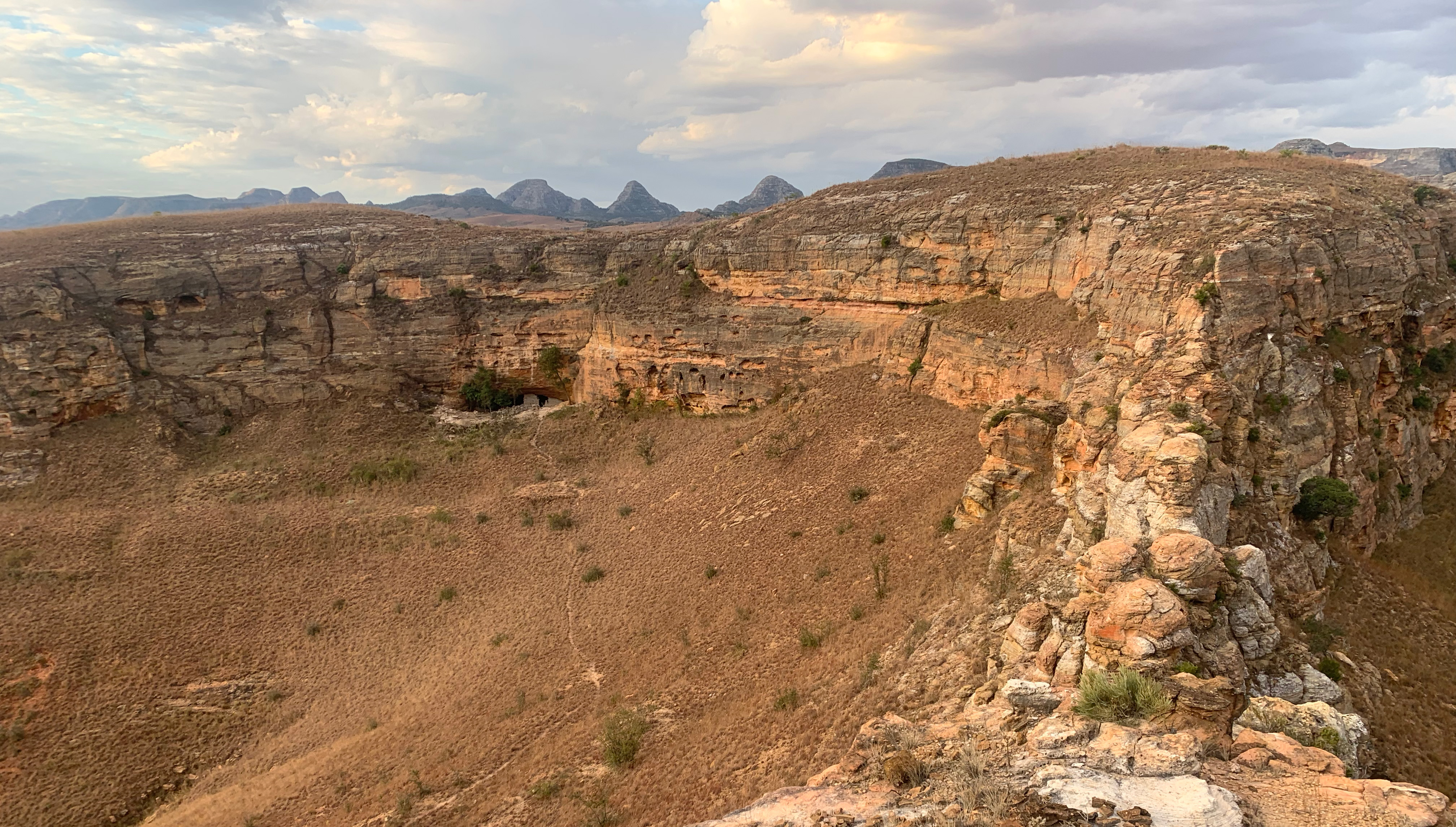
- Petit Grotte [sic] Rock-cut niches Sandstone wall View of fluvial cirque

- Location within Madagascar
- 22°18′06″S 45°18′36″E
- Cultures: Zoroastrian settlers (proposed), Sakalava, Bara
- Region: Ihorombe
- Part of: Isalo Massif

History
- Built: c. 10th–12th centuries CE

Site notes
- Material: Sandstone, conglomerate
- Architectural style: Rock-cut architecture
- Excavation dates: 1971, 2021, 2022, 2024

Teniky (Note: Also Tenika) is a geological and archaeological site located in the Isalo Massif, a mountainous formation in Madagascar's southwestern Ihorombe region. It is situated in relative isolation and seclusion, over 200 kilometers (120 miles) from the nearest coast. The site is notable for its unique rock-cut architecture, which is unlike any other found in Madagascar and the wider East African coast. The enigmatic complex spans nearly 8 square kilometers (3.1 square miles), and contains precise stone walls, quarries, terraces, niches, rock-cut boulders and stone basins.

Radiocarbon dating of charcoal found at newly-discovered man-made structures at the site found them to date to the 10th–12th centuries CE. Shards of Chinese and Southeast Asian pottery found at Teniky date to the 11th–14th centuries CE. A 2024 study of the rock-cut niches at Teniky identified their closest architectural parallels as first-millennium Zoroastrian niches in Iran, particularly in the Fars region, suggesting that the site may have been a necropolis constructed by settlers of Zoroastrian origin.

== Site ==
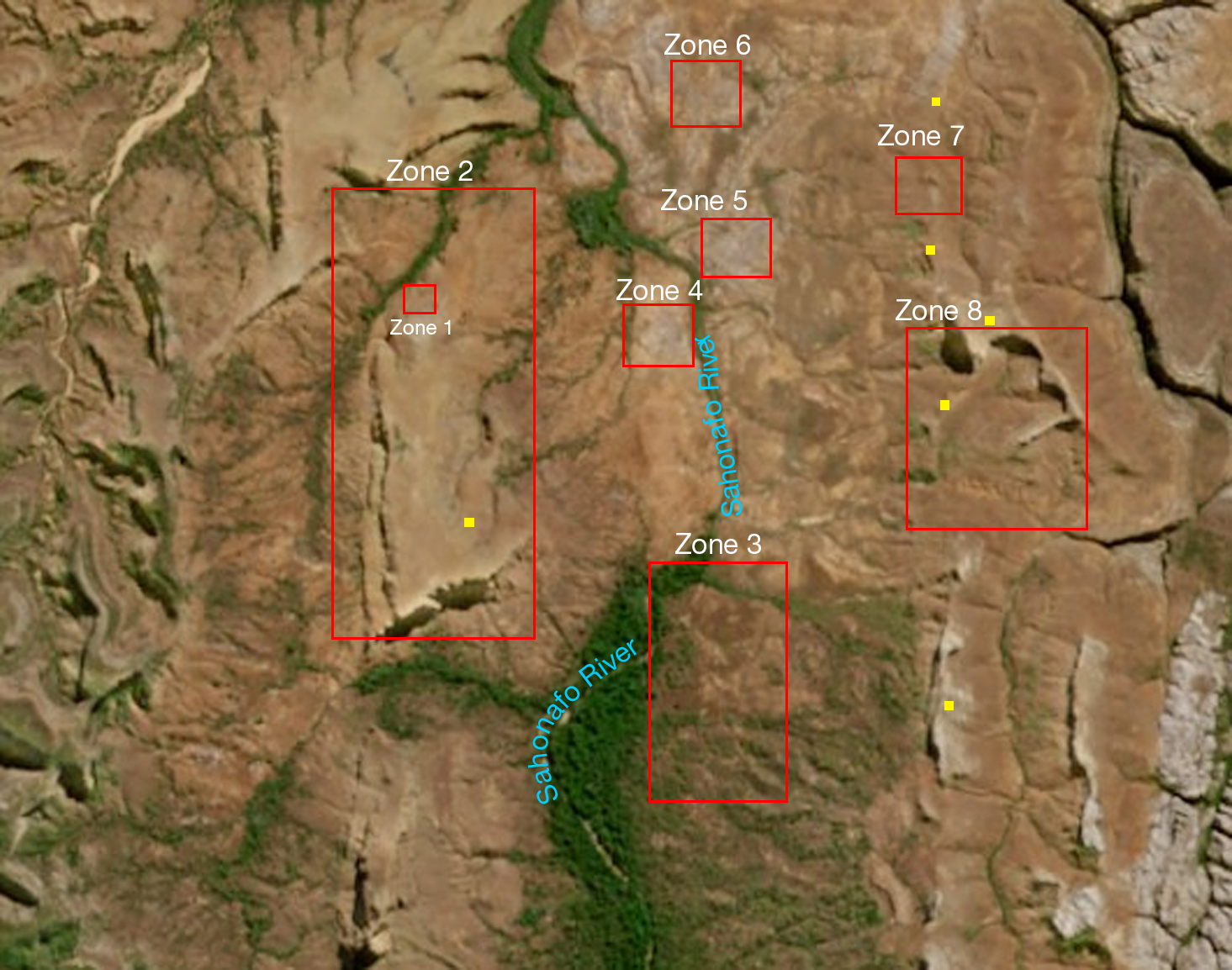
Aerial photograph of the Teniky archaeological site, with archaeological zones distinguished by Schreurs et al. outlined in red, Sakalava tombs marked in yellow, and the Sahonafo River running through the complex.

The Teniky site is accessible only by hiking across steep and rugged terrain—a journey that took researchers eight hours from the nearest village in 2024. It is situated in relative isolation and seclusion, over 200 kilometers (120 miles) from the nearest coast. Its cirque is accessed from an unpaved road originating in Beroroha and passing through Ranohira, Andriamanero, and Tameantsoa, before becoming a footpath going up the mountains of Isalo to Tsimivositra, crossing the canyon of Kelivozana, descending to Ambatomãra and finally branching north before the abandoned village of Sahanafo. Access from Fandranarivo-Berenty is also possible.

The archaeological site features "clustered caves, the entrances to which are partially closed by walls made of cut stones, flat areas with foundation stones, artificially hollowed excavations at the base of the cliffs, carved blocks of stones, etc." The Sahanafo (Note: Also Sahanafa) River runs through the complex, and the terrain is marked by geological formations, including a heart-shaped cirque, across plains and wooded areas. Bushpig and lemurs are "plentiful" in the area, and the river contains a large number of eel.

A 2024 study by Guido Schreurs, professor of geology at the University of Bern, and others (Note: including Chantal Radimilahy) descriptively divides the Teniky site into eight archaeological zones, with the Sahanafo River cutting between the site's eastern and western sides. In Zone 1 are rock-cut niches discovered in 2021. Zone 2, which contains Zone 1, is the westernmost zone of Teniky, comprising a "north-south trending hill with terraces and dry stone walls". Zone 3 contains dry stone walls, including some in a forested area. Zones 4 and 5 contain sandstone quarries on the east and west sides of the Sahanafo, respectively. Zone 6 contains a "nearly closed" circular dry stone wall with a diameter of approximately 150 meters (490 feet). Zone 7 contains terraces and dry stone walls on a ridge. Zone 8 is the previously-known site.

=== Zone 1 ===
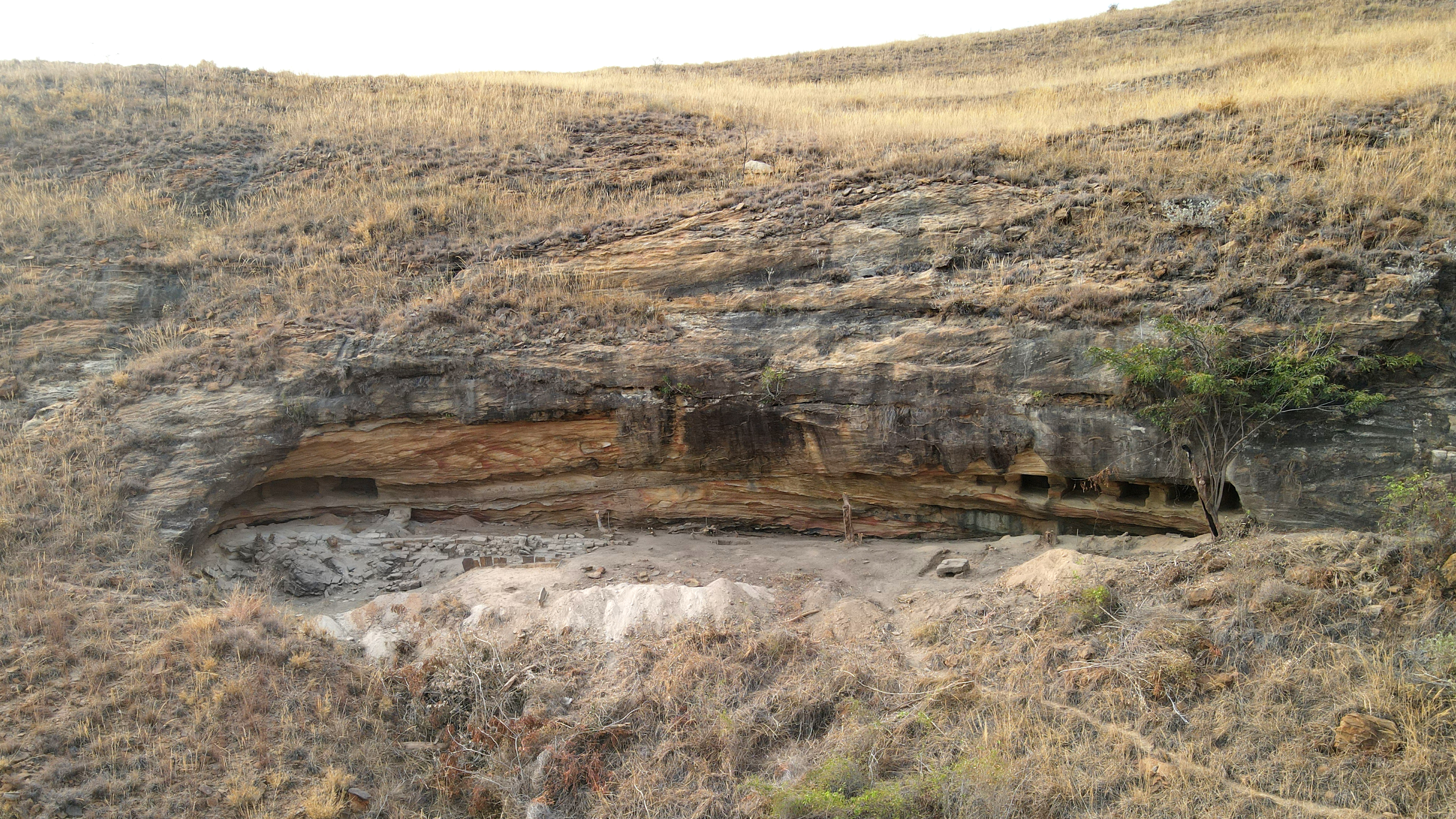
The rock shelter at Zone 1 photographed during a 2022 excavation

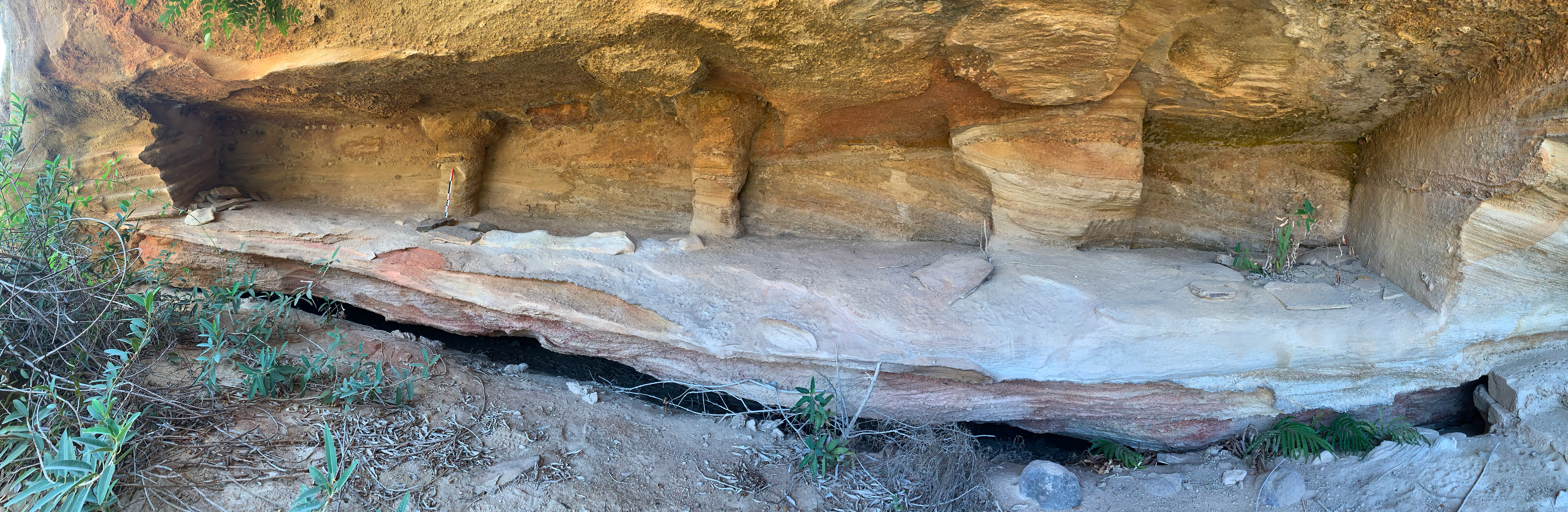
The main niche in Zone 1

In Zone 1 are nine niches—eight quadrangular and one nearly circular—carved into a cliff under a rock shelter. The very eroded main niche, where most archeological structures are concentrated in the zone, is carved with benches and pillars. Two of the three pillars are thinner towards the bottom, flaring toward the ceiling in a quadrangular shape. The third, central column is not carved thinner or flared, giving it a “more massive, rougher appearance". Two stone structures sit on the bench: one long squared sandstone block flanked centrally by two smaller ones, and one pile of mostly flat and rectangular stones. The long block from the first structure was likely taken from the walls in front of the niche, while the rocks in the pile may have been part of the first structure before being moved. Optically stimulated luminescence on the sediment in this niche was not successful, but radiocarbon dating of charcoal pieces from the niche found them to be 986 ± 22 and 1161 ± 22 years old, suggesting a calibrated origin date of 891–1155 CE.

The seven other quadrangular niches and the single circular niche in this rock shelter were excavated but contained no further architectural features or artifacts. Schreurs et al. suggest that the morphology of the niches and pillars in the shelter at Zone 1 indicate two phases of construction, with possibly only a quadrangular niche being carved in the first phase before the addition of the adjacent parts of the structure.

In front of the niches is a conglomerate block carved with feet and a regular central depression—maybe a ceremonial basin used to contain fire or water.

In the northeast part of the shelter are two sandstone walls faced with a flat area partially lined with rock slabs placed vertically in the ground, as well as a stone basin close to the niches in the southwestern part of the rock overhang. The stone walls were apparently laid directly on the earth without a dug foundational trench, and piles of blocks downhill of the structures were likely part of the intact walls. A structure resembling stairs or an entrance sits at the end of the shorter wall. Excavation along the longer wall found charcoal flakes and ash in the layers of sediment, as well as another layer containing burned roots, indicating possibly natural fire. A stratigraphic excavation along the shorter wall found a man-made layer of dust made of demolished sandstone blocks mixed with sand to stabilize the ground. Beneath this layer is sandy loam with charcoal flakes and unidentified animal bones. The fire’s nature as man-made or natural is indeterminate, and there are no apparent traces of man-made cuts on the bones. Radiocarbon dating of charcoal from this site found the samples to be from 891–990 CE and 991–1138 CE.

Adjacent to the walls is a two-sided structure defined by stones placed vertically into the earth. Between this structure and the longer wall are two fragments of a stone basin.

3D scans of rock-cut architecture and artifacts found at Teniky

A shard of pottery, determined to be of Southeast Asian origin and dated to the 11th–13th centuries CE, was found in excavation of Zone 1. The charcoal and pottery dating suggests that the niches and walls in Zone 1 date to the late first/early second millennia CE. Schreurs et al. consider the entire complex in Zone 1 to likely have been of ritual use, and unlikely to have been of domestic use.

=== Zones 2 and 3 ===
Zone 2 covers a 1,500 meter-long and 500 meter-wide hill trending north to south. Its highest point stands 200 meters above the valley floor and seats a rectangular structure of walls surrounding a raised platform. Schreurs et al. opine that the platform was probably used for occasional ritual activities. The hill is flanked with terraces, some of which are bordered by dry stone walls.

Zone 3, in the valley east of the Sahanafo River, contains a wooded area delimited by a square dry stone wall, inside of which are some other segments of dry stone wall. Schreurs et al. find that these are the remains of dry, unhewn stone walls no higher than 1 meter. One wall in the north is 120 meters long, and another, in the eastern part of the zone, is 750 meters long and runs north-northeast/south-southwest. Also in the northern part of the zone is a pair of circular dry stone walls 1.5 meters each in diameter and height. Shards of Chinese celadon ware and Southeast Asian stoneware dated between the 11th and 14th centuries AD were found between the square wall and the 750 meter-long wall.

=== Zones 4 and 5 ===
Zones 4 and 5, respectively west and east of the Sahonafo River, contain sandstone quarries. Mineral compositions of the partially extracted blocks found in these quarries are similar to those in the blocks used to construct the walls at the rock shelters in zones 1 and 8, between which the two quarries are roughly central (roughly 1–1.5 kilometers (0.62–0.93 mi) from the quarries to each wall). Schreurs et al. consider it likely that these rock shelter walls were constructed with blocks sourced from the quarries in Zones 4 and 5.

=== Zones 6 and 7 ===
An "imposing" dry stone wall arranged in a nearly-closed circular shape with a diameter of 150 meters sits in Zone 6. The wall is constructed from blocks of sandstone and conglomerate rock. The wall is discontinuous in its northern, eastern, and southern portions. There are no apparent signs of demolition. The geography of the site slopes upward to the north, obscuring the horizon when facing that direction. This, coupled with the circle's discontinuity, make it unlikely in the opinion of Schreurs et al. that the structure was an observation post. The lack of signs of demolition to explain the openings in the structure's perimeter make it also unlikely that it was some sort of animal enclosure. Schreurs et al. consider it enigmatic.

Zone 7, conversely, contains a likely observation post, considering the excellent views offered by the summit of the escarpment found in the zone, which also includes a number of terraces and dry stone walls.

=== Zone 8 ===
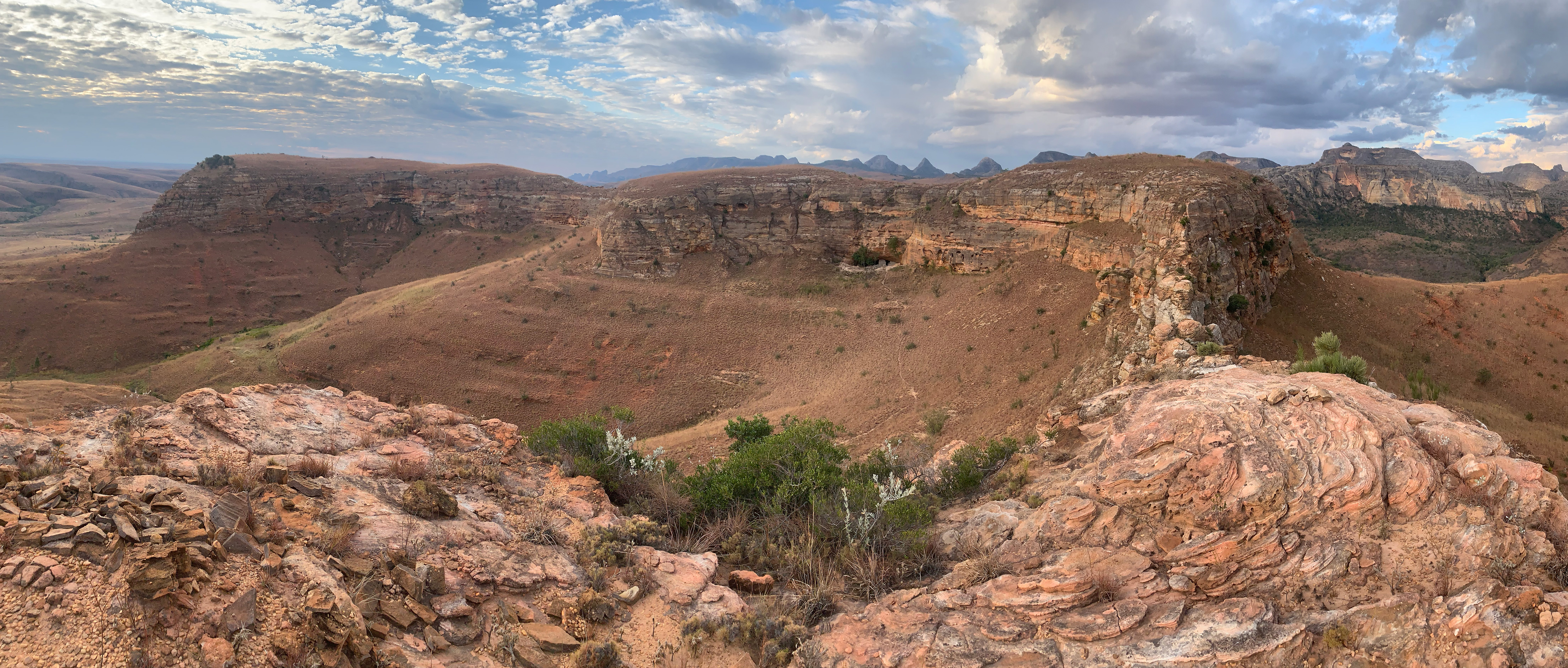
The fluvial cirque comprising Zone 8 of Teniky, containing the Grande Grotte and Petit Grotte [sic]

600 meters south of Zone 7 is Zone 8, the previously-known heart-shaped cirque formed by fluval erosion where rock-cut architecture, terraces, and carved sandstone walls are situated. Man-made terraces in Zone 8 cover an area of roughly 20 hectares (49 acres), with the largest terrace having an area of 1,200 square metres (13,000 ft^{2}). The main archaeological structures of the cirque include dozens of rock-cut niches, sandstone walls, carved boulders, a rock-cut chamber called the Petit Grotte [sic], and a walled rock shelter called the Grande Grotte.

==== Petit Grotte ====
The Petit Grotte [sic], so referred to by Ginther and Hébert in 1963, is situated in the northern face of the southernmost cliffs of the cirque. Its entrance is approximately 140 centimetres (55 in) high and 100 centimetres (39 in) wide, and its maximum internal height is roughly 120 centimetres (47 in). The chamber's floor is covered with quartz grains, and three large, "beautifully carved" pillars—one broken and attached only at the top—are carved in the chamber's center. Benches with small pillars on their backs are carved into three sides of the chamber. Schreurs et al. consider the chamber to have likely served a ritual function. The first archaeological description of Teniky, published in 1950, reports that residents of Sahonafo refer to the cave as "the market", and elderly Sahonato resident Tsimangataka said that this was where the Vazaha foreigners had stored their belongings (see Teniky § Archaeology and theories of origin).

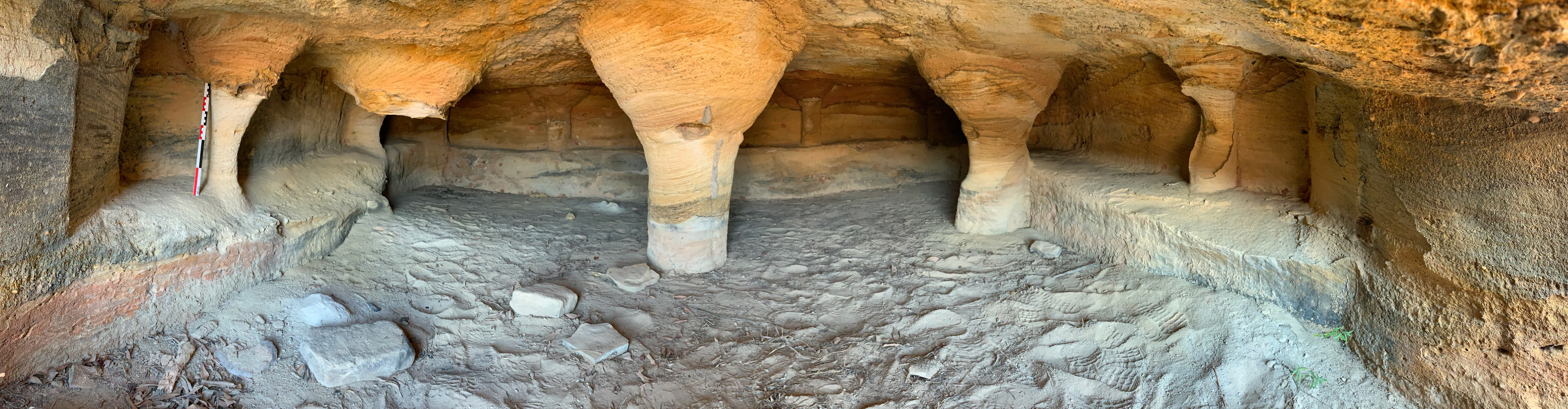
The Petit Grotte carved with three central pillars (one broken) and a bench supported by pillars

==== Grande Grotte ====
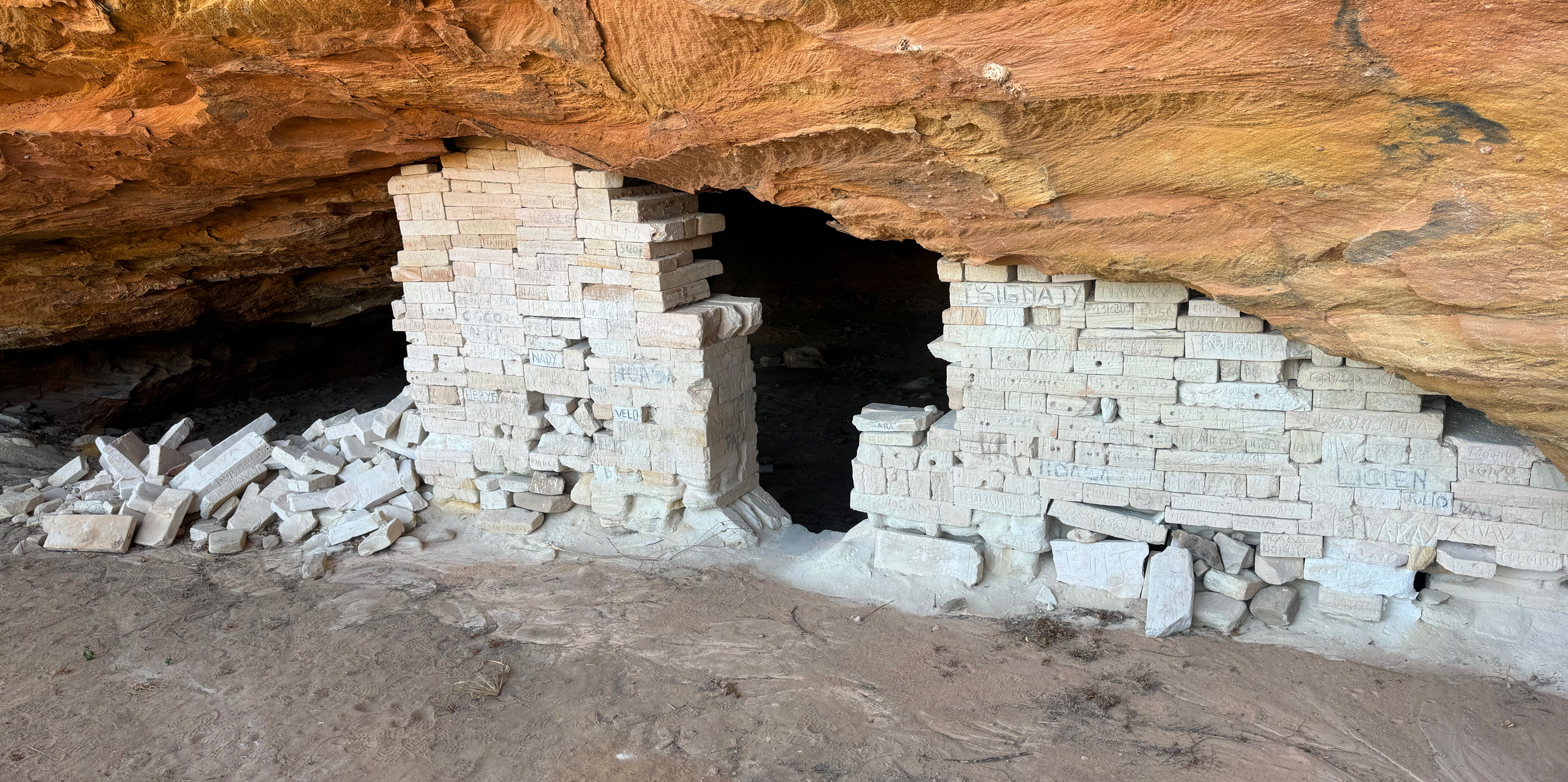
The inner wall of the Grande Grotte, photographed in 1940–41 and in 2022. Part of the wall has collapsed, and some of the doorway's stones are gone.

A large rock shelter, referred to by Ginther and Hébert as Grande Grotte, is delimited by two parallel stone walls assembled without mortar from precisely squared and stacked sandstone blocks. The inner wall is 15 meters (49 ft) long, 3 meters (9.8 ft) high, and 70 centimeters (28 in) wide, and contains an opening—probably an entrance to the shelter. Bevelled blocks on either side of the apparent entrance's base suggest that the opening may once have held "some kind of closure". The left part of the inner wall has collapsed, and had degraded somewhat since a 1940 expedition (photographed by Jacques Faublée) by 2021. Almost every block of the wall bears carved graffiti with names and dates going back to the late 19th century. The remains of the parallel outer wall are darkly weathered from exposure to rain and wind, but scratching the outer wall's blocks reveals the same light color as the inner wall's blocks'. The blocks' sandstone was likely sourced from the quarries in Zones 4 and 5.

The construction style of the parallel walls of the Grande Grotte is unique and unknown across Madagascar and all of the East African coast. A niche containing a bench is cut into the northern part of the rock shelter, with a recessed opening that suggests it could be closed off.

==== Niches ====
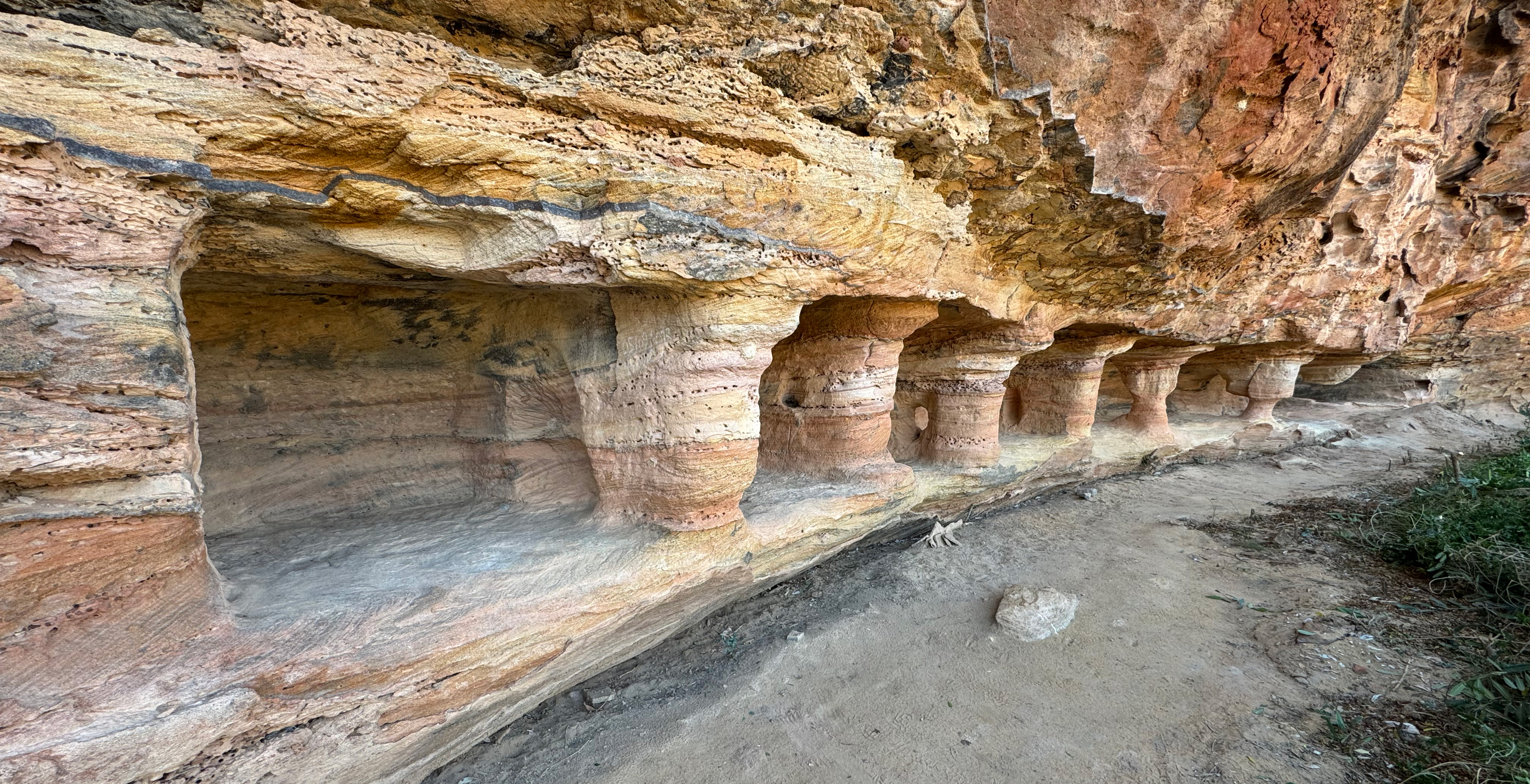
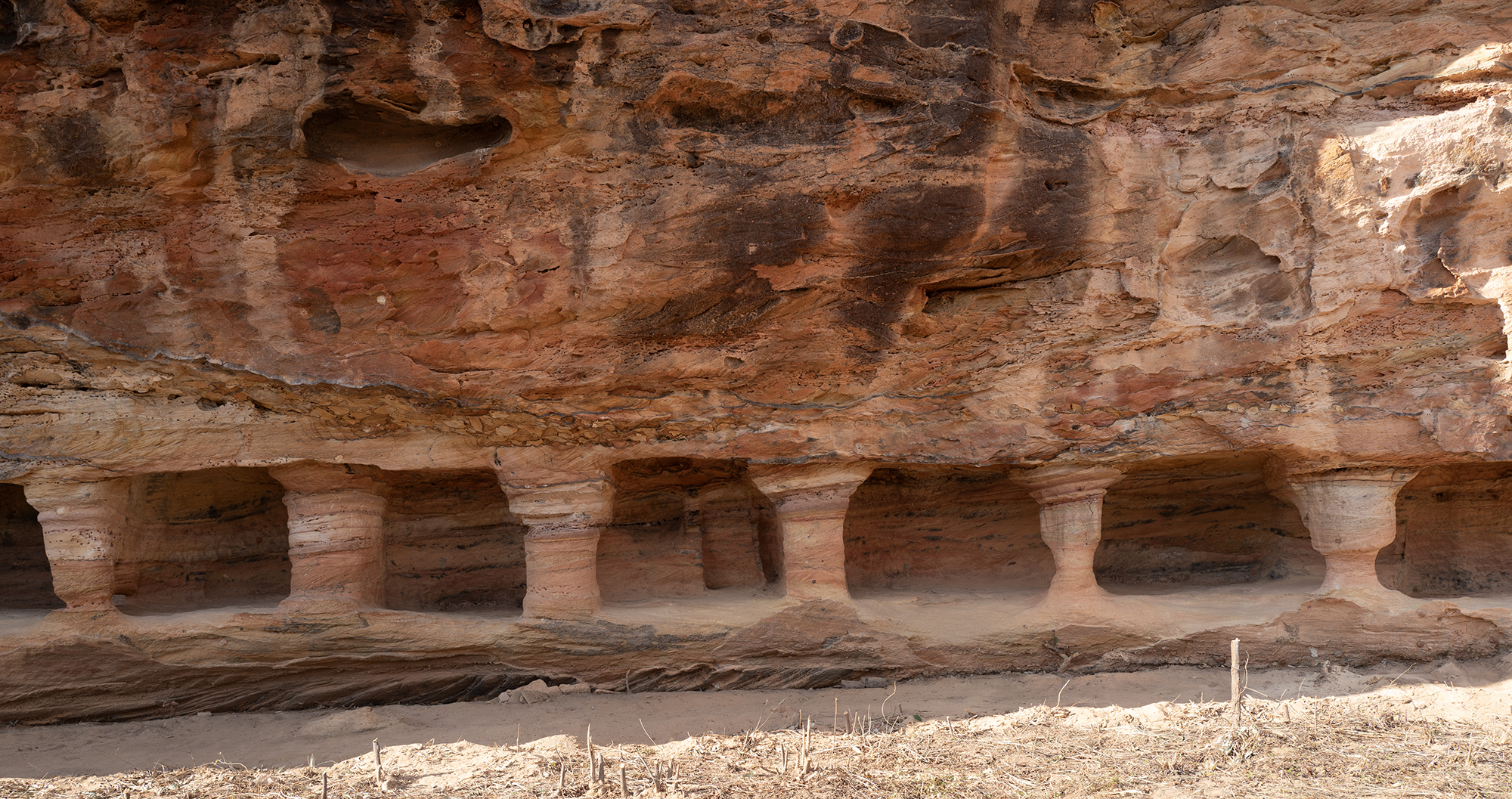
Ten rectangular niches are carved in a cliff face northwest of the Grande Grotte. They are separated by walls which look like pillars from the front.

Carved in a cliff face about 200 meters (660 ft) northwest of the Grande Grotte are ten rectangular niches, roughly 120 centimeters (47 in) high and 80 centimeters (31 in) wide and deep, separated by vertical walls which have pillar-like shapes in frontal view. Some lighter, less friable layers in the sandstone still bear tool marks. 10 meters (33 ft) north of these rectangular niches are four circular niches cut into a cliff face 1 meter (3.3 ft) above ground level. A circular depression at the same level but 70 centimeters (28 in) from the southernmost niche is possibly a heavily eroded fifth niche.

Just south of the Petit Grotte is a series of niches cut roughly 1 meter (3.3 ft) above ground level, with circular recesses around their openings which suggest that the niches could be closed off with stones or wooden slabs.

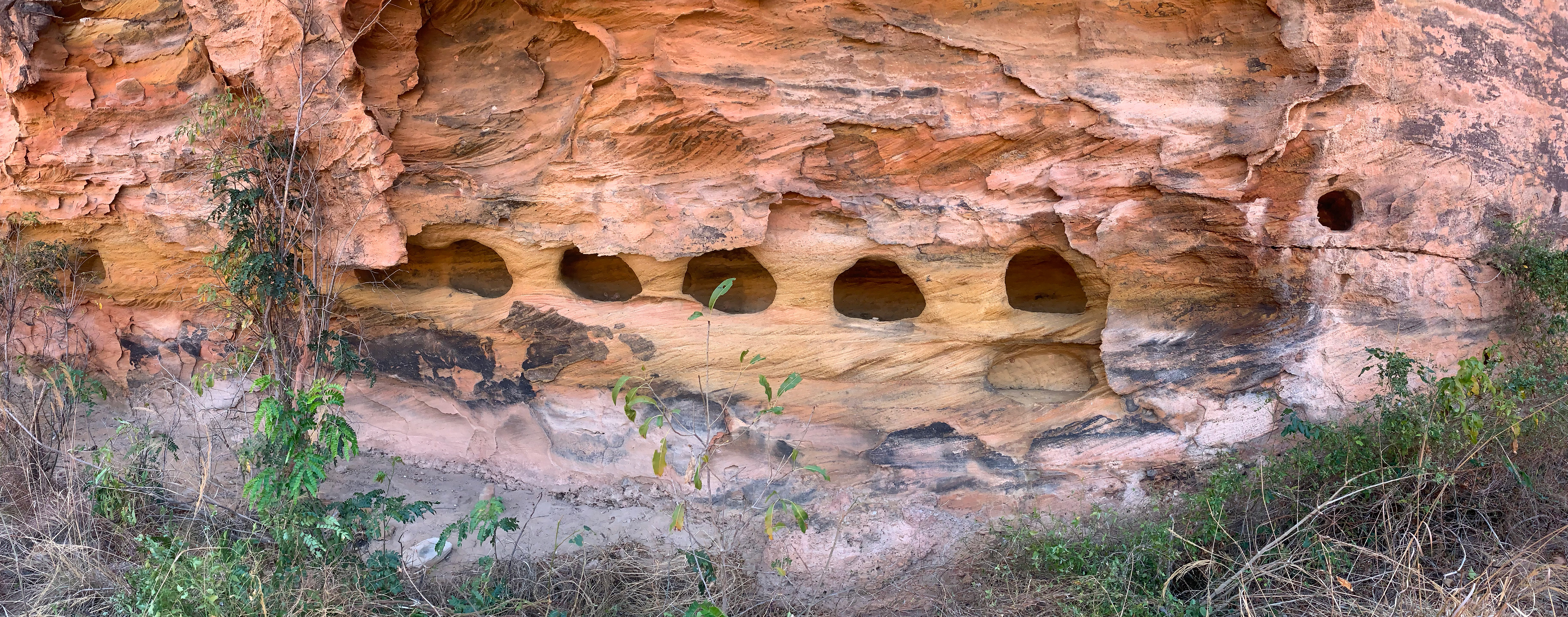
Six niches (the first two having eroded together) are cut into the cliff face northeast of the Petit Grotte

Roughly 150 meters (490 ft) northeast of the Petit Grotte is a series of six roughly circular niches cut into the cliffs around 120 centimetres (47 in) above ground level and spaced roughly 1 meter (3.3 ft) apart. Two of the niches have eroded together into one, and several niches are connected through holes carved into their dividing walls. 2 metres (6.6 ft) from these six meters is a single niche cut at a slightly higher level.

On the northern side of the cliffs are six rectangular rock-cut niches with irregular back walls, suggesting that they were left unfinished.

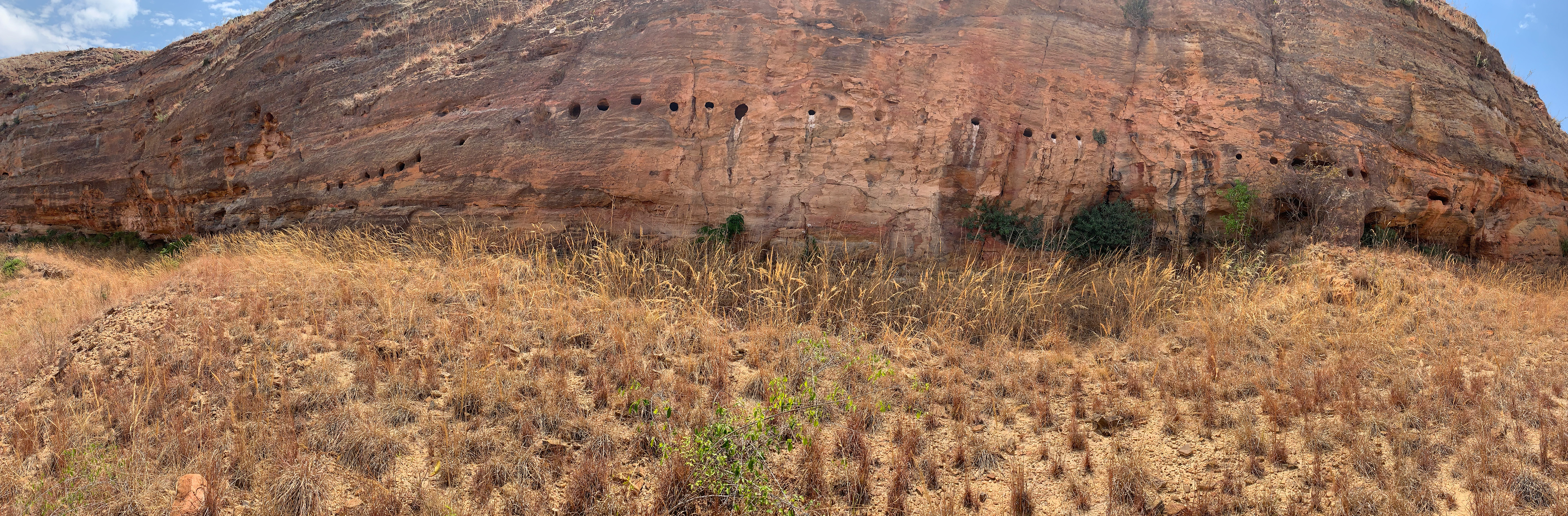
A series of 40 circular rock-cut niches decorate the cirque close to its cleft

A series of 35 smaller carved niches covers an approximate horizontal distance of 40 meters (130 ft). No artifacts were found within the niches in the 2021–2022 archaeological survey, though some niches contained the nests of birds of prey.

==== Slabs, blocks, and rock-cut boulders ====
A terrace in the cirque contains aligned sandstone slabs, suggesting a structure whose longest face is parallel to the adjacent cliff wall. On the inner side of the slabs is a conglomerate block with recesses carved into its sides and top—possibly a basin to contain water or fire.

On the slopes of the cliffs of the cirque are two large conglomerate boulders, apparently carved and eroded. The first, roughly 1 meter (3.3 ft) high, has a rectangular base that is stepped on one side and a gabled roof. Its four sides have two recessed openings each, suggesting that the openings could be closed off. The boulder's interior has been hollowed out with a flat base. The second boulder, of approximately the same shape and size as the first, is also hollowed out, with a pillar in its center resembling the pillars inside the Petit Grotte. Ginther and Hébert, considered these boulders to be likely architectural models for the Petit Grotte, but Schruers et al. consider such an effortfully carved model to be unlikely, and instead opine that the boulders were ritual objects.

=== Sakalava Tombs ===
Throughout the area of the Tenika site are six stone tombs associated with the Sakalava culture, standing 1–1.5 metres (3.3–4.9 ft) high, mostly on elevated ridges. All the tombs show signs of looting and destruction. The Sakalava people inhabited the site until being driven out by the Bara, most likely in the 19th century. Residents of a Bara village called Sahanafo on the Sahanafo River's eastern bank were relocated outside the boundaries of the Isalo National Park in 1962, the year of the park's establishment.

== Archaeology and theories of origin ==
Teniky's cirque was first described (as 'Tenika') by Renaud Paulian and Y. Dommergues in 1950, and its first archaeological survey was published in 1971 by Ramilisonina and Jean Aime Rokotoarisoa.

As reported by Paulian and Dommergues, the Bara residents of the village of Sahonafo believed the Grande Grotte to have been occupied by a large malevolent being who ate everything in sight. He lived there with his wife and their child, named Tenika. One day, Tenika broke the jug while fetching water; not daring to return to the Grande Grotte, Tenika fled to the Petit Grotte. In the evening, the mother called out for Tenika, saying that the door is open. The father scolded that Tenika must have broken the jug. The authors note that malevolent beings are common in Isalo, including Kinoly in the caves of Ranomena and Kalanoro in the Tenetys among the canyons. An alternate story says that a couple named Tenika lived in the caves, sleeping in the smallest. The couple was said to be foreign to the area.

Paulian and Dommergues also report a "protohistorical account" from an elderly resident of Sahonafo, which explains the site’s history in the context of a war between settling long-robed Vazaha (foreigners) and the inhabitants of Isalo valley. By day the Vazaha gathered for battle, and at night their leader slept in the Petit Grotte. The elderly resident, named Tsimangataka, also reported from his own memory that the site had remained unchanged since the arrival of Europeans, who demolished half of a stone enclosure at the entrance of the Grande Grotte and the lintel of "the only door still in existence"—a feature which later surveys and excavations did not report.

In 1963, French anthropologist and archaeologist Pierre Vérin proposed that the inhabitants of the caves at Teniky may have been connected to the Rasikajy culture. In 1971 he suggested connections also to the Rezoky River and Asambalahy sites in southwestern Madagascar, and proposed that Teniky's Grotte Portugais was a refuge site for "Islamized individuals" involved in some sort of trade, likely involving cattle, who had fled the Asambalahy site 65 kilometers (40 mi) to Teniky's west.

The Grande Grotte in Zone 8 is the most well-known archaeological site at Teniky, known since at least the late 19th century. The Grotte has been referred to by various names, including Grotte des Portugais, a reference to a theory by French naturalists Alfred and Guillaume Grandidier that the site's walls were built by shipwrecked Portuguese sailors in the early sixteenth century—an interpretation that later archaeologists found unlikely. Other names include Grande Grotte, les sarcophages, le temple du soleil, la colonnade du marché, les réceptacles, and les nids de pigeons. This interpretation was ruled out decisively by Schreurs et al. because the charcoal and pottery found at Teniky predated the earliest Portuguese ships in the Indian Ocean—though the authors noted that it could not be ruled out that later Portuguese mariners had "stayed for some time at Teniky during an attempt to traverse the island".

The site is poorly preserved, and has been the subject of touristic vandalism, looting, and degradation since at least the 1940s, including the enigmatic architecture and the Sakalava tombs.

=== Schreurs et al. excavations and Zoroastrian necropolis theory ===
A 2019 examination of satellite imagery revealed the Teniky archaeological complex to be far larger than previously known—nearly 8 square kilometres (3.1 mi^{2}). Prior to this, only Zone 8 of the complex had been known. This discovery, which included terraces, niches, paths, and stone walls, prompted the first detailed archaeological surveys of the site, conducted from 2021 to 2024, with the help of six local guides and 150 porters in the latest expedition. The team of archaeologists considered the site to be "part of a coherent archaeological assemblage made by a specific group of people who lived [at Teniky] about a 1000 years ago." It is unclear how long the builders and original inhabitants of Teniky inhabited the site.

The rock-cut architecture at Teniky is unlike any other site in Madagascar or the broader East African coast. The deep inland location of the site makes its builders particularly enigmatic, though the presence of Chinese and Southeast Asian ceramics indicate participation in Indian Ocean trade networks. Considering that the earliest humans in Madagascar are likely to have arrived in the first millennium AD, Schreurs et al. find it likely that the builders of Teniky brought their culture from elsewhere rather than developed it independently by the end of the first millennium. The team hypothesizes that the builders of Teniky were settlers of Zoroastrian origin, on the basis of rock-cut architecture found at archaeological sites in Iran—for instance, the niches in Siraf—being the closest stylistic and technical parallel to the architecture at Teniky. Siraf is known to have been an important port on the Persian Gulf in the mid/late first millennium, docking ships participating in the Indian Ocean trade network. Rock-cut niches with carved benches, used to hold human remains, have been interpreted by archaeologists as Zoroastrian ossuaries.

Researchers listed the following similarities between the niches found at Teniky and Siraf:

1. "Larger niches are often closely aligned next to one another with a relatively narrow division between adjacent niches, giving rise to a pillar shape in frontal view."
2. "The openings of the larger niches are either rectangular or arched with a flat base."
3. "There is always a vertical distance between the base of the niche and the ground, i.e. none of the niches reach the ground."
4. "Some of the smaller rock-cut niches show recesses, suggesting that they could be closed."

That the openings of the niches at Teniky never touch the ground aligns with Zoroastrian funerary tradition, which dictates that the exposed cadaver may not touch the ground and must be protected from the elements. The larger niches were proposed to be like Zoroastrian dakhmas, where the bodies were exposed, and the smaller niches to Zoroastrian astōdans, where the bones were kept in chambers closed by wood or stone slabs. The carved boulders may also have been astōdans. The diversity of sizes and styles of astōdans may correspond to the different social statuses of the interred.

The stone basins and tables with recessions and openings found at Teniky also show stylistic similarities with Zoroastrian basins, tables, and plateaus used in ritual ceremonies, including those found in the Urvisagh chamber of the typical Zoroastrian temple complex.

Nathan Anderson, an archaeologist of other early Malagasy settlements, found the Zoroastrian hypothesis "compelling", stating: "when you really look at the data, when you look at the architecture, it’s hard to find another plausible explanation". One problem with the theory is the absence of human bones at Teniky. The authors propose that the ancient bones may have been removed for use in ritual magic by later peoples. The apparently defensive arrangement of walls at Teniky leads the authors to propose that the settlement was attacked.

The authors propose potential connections with archaeological sites downriver of the Sahonafo, as well as other contemporaneous archaeological sites in northern Madagascar such as Kingany, Mahilaka, Vohemar, Nosy Mangabe, and those in the Mananara Valley, to be investigated in future comparative studies. Another expedition led by Schreurs is being planned for 2025.

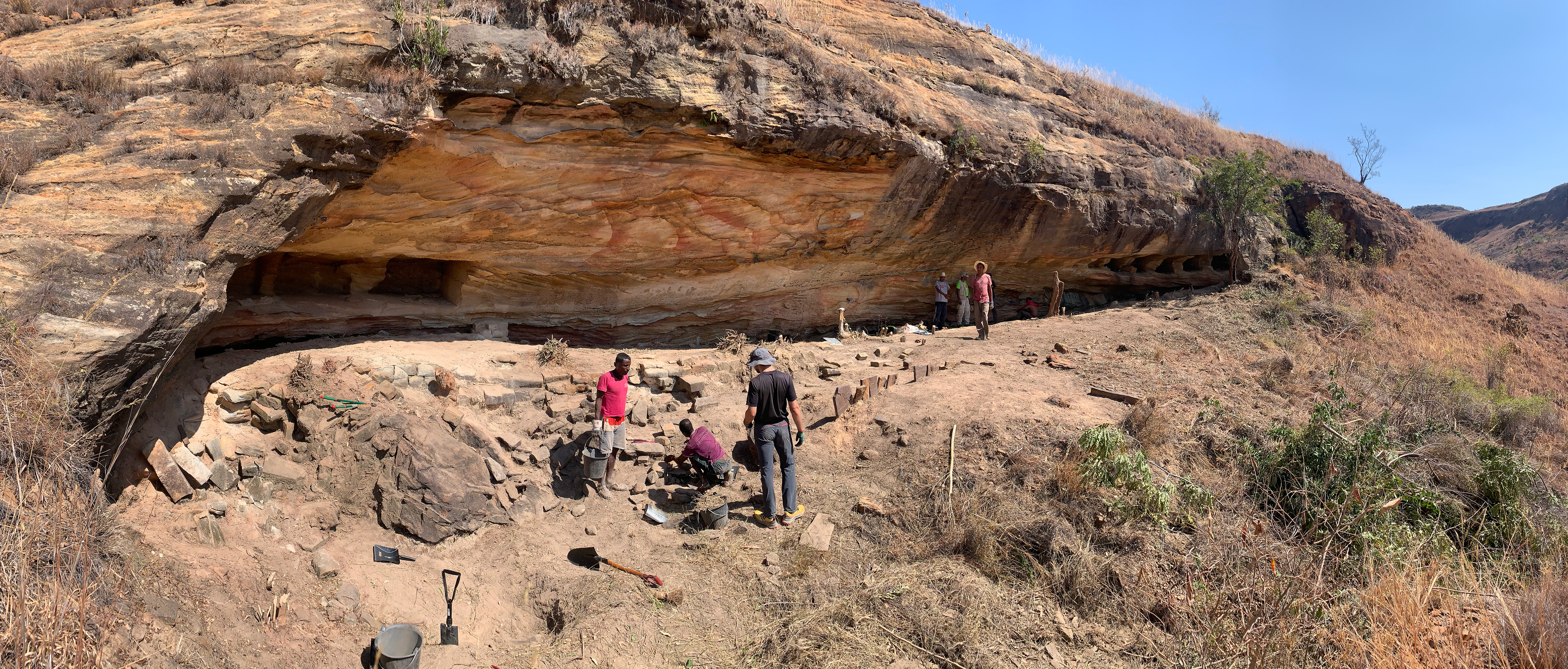
2022 excavation of Zone 1 rock shelter led by Guido Schreurs

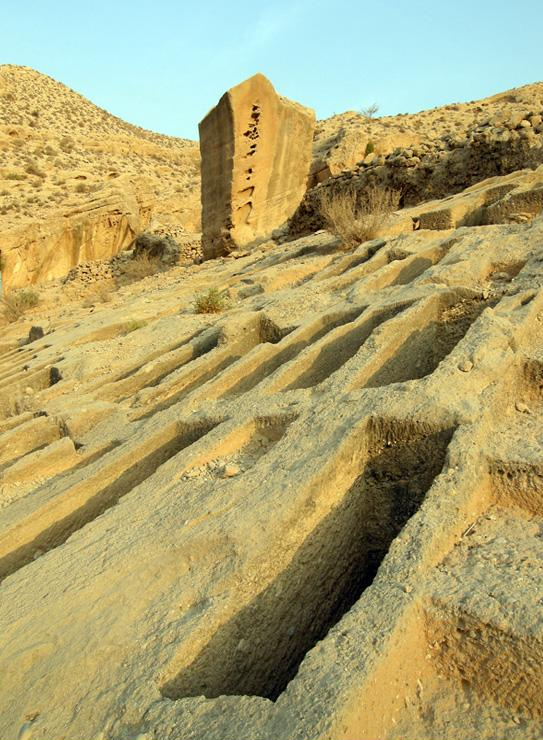
Rock-cut graves at Bandar Siraf, Iran

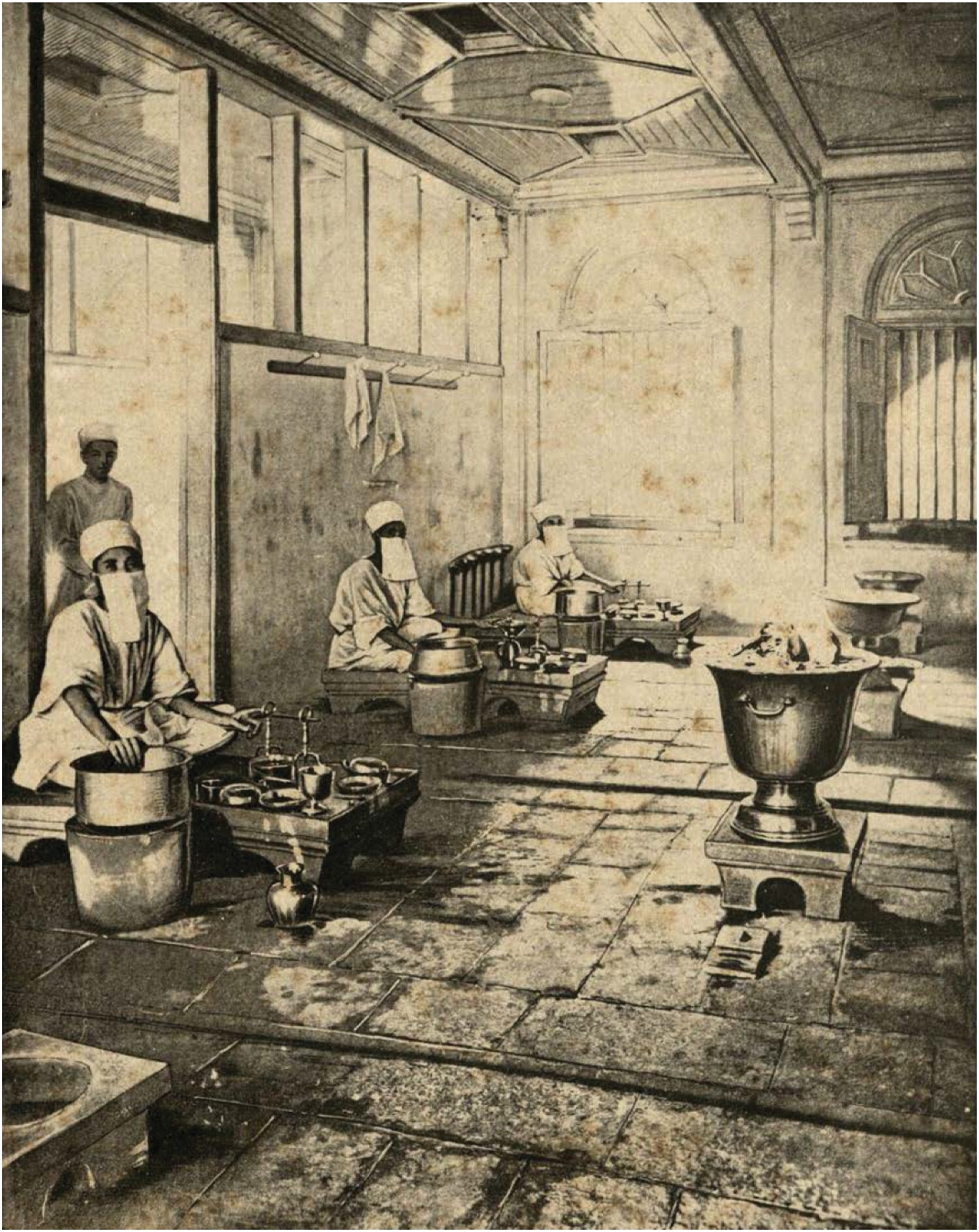
Stone tables in this Zoroastrian Urvisagh ceremonial chamber resemble the stone tables and basins found at Teniky
