= Rasikajy civilization =

Pre-European archaeological culture in Northeastern Madagascar

Rasikajy
- Geographical range: Northeastern Madagascar
- Period: ca. 8th–late 15th centuries CE

The Rasikajy civilization was an archaeological culture that inhabited northeastern Madagascar from roughly the 8th to late 15th centuries CE. The material culture they left behind, including soapstone (chlorite schist) vessels, imported Chinese pottery, metalworks, and beads, was discovered in systematic excavations of northern Madagascar in the 19th and 20th centuries. The word Rasikajy was reported in 1941 to be a local term for "a group of people that came from overseas and made objects from soapstone", and in 2000 to refer to "the people of the distant past who mined chlorite schist and worked this soft stone into vessels". Most of the evidence for the Rasikajy culture comes from excavations at a necropolis in Vohemar, discovered in the late 19th century. Though archaeologists expect that a settlement must have existed near to the necropolis, no such site has been discovered.

== Vohemar necropolis ==
=== Excavations ===
Guillaume Grandidier acknowledged a cemetery at Vohemar in 1899 and carried out the first excavations of it, discovering only human bones and no artifacts. In 1906, Maurein carried out a more successful excavation and donated a collection of burial objects excavated from Vohemar to the Muséum d'histoire naturelle de Nîmes. In a note accompanying the donation, Maurein interpreted the cemetery as an "extensive Arab burial place with Muslim tombs". The first "large-scale investigation" of the cemetery was conducted by Gaudebout and Vernier in 1941, excavating 261 tombs. More than 800 objects or parts of objects were unearthed and removed from the tombs during excavations in the early 1940s. Burial objects from the Vohemar cemetery include soapstone objects (including "tripod vessels, cups, and pierced circular disks"), iron objects (including "knives, machetes, and a saw"), jewellery made from silver, bronze and gold, pottery, spoons, mirrors, spoons, needles, glassware, beads, and "decorated bone objects". Most of the "remarkably diverse" pottery recovered from Vohemar is of Chinese origin, though some earthenware, including dishes decorated with "unknown forms of writing" are of unknown origin. Pierre Vérin interpreted the earthenware as imported Islamic pottery. Excavations of Vohemar in 1948 and 1955 unearthed Malagasy pottery "in identical shapes as similar Chinese or Islamic objects".

== See also ==
- Teniky, site in Southern central Madagascar tentatively associated with the Rasikajy civilization
