= Google Street View coverage =

The following is a timeline for Google Street View, a technology implemented in Google Maps and Google Earth that provides ground-level interactive panoramas of cities. The service was first introduced in the United States on May 25, 2007, covering five cities: San Francisco, Las Vegas, Denver, Miami, and New York City. By the end of 2008, Street View had full coverage available for all of the major and minor cities in the continental United States and was expanding its scope to include some of the country's national parks, as well as cities elsewhere in the world. For the first year and a half of its existence, Street View featured camera icon markers, each representing at least one major city or area (such as a park). Ten years after its creation, Street View had provided imagery for more than 10 million miles' worth of roads across 83 countries worldwide.

== Key additions ==
Time lapse additions from the start of the service to September 2023, including countries with public street view available

- In 2005, Google employees start the first tests of Google Street View using a van with roof-mounted cameras in the San Francisco area.
- On May 25, 2007, Street View was announced.
- On May 30, 2007, at the Where 2.0 Conference, Immersive Media Company was identified as the contractor that captured the imagery for four of the five cities initially mapped by Street View, using its patented dodecahedral camera array on a moving car. Immersive Media continued to do image capture for Street View until Google developed independent capability. Since July 2007, Google has used imagery that belongs exclusively to Google.
- On April 16, 2008, Street View was fully integrated into Google Earth 4.3.
- On May 5, 2008, Google improves the quality of Street View captures.
- On May 12, 2008, Google announced that it was testing face-blurring technology on its photos of the busy streets of Manhattan. The technology uses an algorithm to search Google's image database for faces and blurs them, according to John Hanke, director of Google Earth and Google Maps.
- On June 10, 2008, two other features included in the update were an effective mask of the "Google Car" and the application of face-blurring technology on all photos, which lowered the resolution across all photos, even the formerly high resolution images of San Francisco. Also, many metro areas nearby featured cities were included, but they did not receive their own camera icons.
- On July 2, 2008, Google Street View was introduced outside of the United States for the first time, in France and Italy. This was also the debut of Google's new 2nd Generation Cameras. 19 camera icons were added, mostly showing small towns and areas along the Tour de France route and part of northwestern Italy.
- On August 4, 2008, 28 icons of major metropolitan areas of both Australia and Japan were added to Google Street View. Included in the update were approximately 40 new U.S. hub cities.
- On November 26, 2008, the Street View button and all camera icons were deleted. Instead of clicking the "Street View" button, this is now accessed using the "pegman" button in the left-hand corner. When the "pegman" icon is dragged over the map, blue polylines appear where Street View is available and a small window shows the current Street View. If this is dropped on the map the Street View opens and takes over the whole map window.
- On December 1, 2008, New Zealand was added to Google Street View. Faces were blurred upon recommendation by the New Zealand Privacy Commission, but vehicle registration plates were not obscured.
- On April 9, 2009, Street View became available with a full-screen option.
- On June 5, 2009, Smart Navigation was introduced, which allows users to navigate the panoramas by double-clicking.
- In January 2010, Google began to introduce the third generation of cameras, allowing better image quality.
- In mid-June 2010, Google added blue dots to its maps that display user-submitted images in all locations around the world, including land areas where Street View is not available and bodies of water. These images can be pulled up on the screen in the same manner as a Street View image with the pegman by dragging it onto the blue dot.
- On October 30, 2012, Google announced that users could contribute to Street View by creating a panorama-like image from the Galaxy Nexus smartphone to share on Google Maps.
- On February 14, 2013, Wii Street U was released for the Wii U.
- On November 6, 2013, Google reintroduces Pegman, which had been removed a few months prior, to make way for a new design, and even a new Pegman who introduces icons following the location.
- On April 23, 2014, a new historical option was introduced to Street View. The date of panoramas can be selected from the timeline.
- Starting in August 2017, Google allows users to create their own Street View-like blue paths, for the connected photospheres that are sufficiently close to one another.
- On September 7, 2017, Google announces the arrival of a new generation of more efficient and precise cameras on the occasion of the 10th anniversary of Street View. This is the 4th generation of cameras, sporting a more refined profile and a blue color.
- On December 3, 2020, Google announced that users could contribute to Street View by capturing video using their AR-supported phones using the Street View app.
- May 24, 2022: Google announces the arrival of a new generation four camera on the occasion of the 15th anniversary of Street View for 2023, this one able to cover areas less accessible by car thanks to its lesser weight.
- May 24, 2022: Google announces the history feature of Street View on iOS and Android, allowing users to view past shots of an area that have been captured repeatedly.

== Timeline of introductions ==
For the virtual tours of museums, see Google Arts and Culture#Timeline of introductions

The following timeline lists the date of each location's earliest set of Street View captures. Imagery for each update was captured anywhere from one to twelve months before the stated release date.

=== 2007 ===
Release date	Major locations added
May	San Francisco, Las Vegas, Denver, Miami, New York City, in United States
August	Los Angeles, San Diego, Houston, Orlando, in United States
October	Portland, Phoenix, Tucson, Chicago, Pittsburgh, Philadelphia, in United States
December	Dallas, Fort Worth, Minneapolis, Saint Paul, Indianapolis, Plainfield, Detroit, Providence, Boston, Hartford, in United States

=== 2008 ===
Release date	Major locations added
February	Juneau, Boise, Salt Lake City, San Antonio, Kansas City, Milwaukee, Raleigh, Durham, Chapel Hill, Albany, Schenectady, Manchester, in United States
March	Anchorage, Fairbanks, Spokane, Yosemite National Park, Albuquerque, Austin, Little Rock, Rockford, Madison, Nashville, Cleveland, Tampa, St. Petersburg, and Richmond in United States
May	Updated images of Manhattan, New York City, in United States
June	Sacramento, Stockton, Fresno, Bakersfield, Reno, Lincoln, Topeka, Oklahoma City, Tulsa, St. Louis, Ann Arbor, Jackson, Knoxville, Lexington, Louisville, Huntsville, Atlanta, Cincinnati, Columbus, Dayton, Toledo, Jacksonville, Fort Lauderdale, Boca Raton, West Palm Beach, Sarasota, Cape Coral, Columbia, Greenville, Charlotte, Winston-Salem, Buffalo, Rochester, Syracuse, Newark, Virginia Beach; and Everglades, Grand Teton, Joshua Tree, Lake Tahoe, Rocky Mountain, Sequoia, and Yellowstone National Parks; in United States; Expanded coverage of Boise, Boston, Kansas City, Miami, Nashville, New York City, Orlando, Philadelphia, Phoenix, Portland, Richmond, San Diego, San Francisco, Tampa, and Tucson, in United States
July	2008 Tour de France route: Aigurande, Auray, Bourg d'Oisans, Brest, Brioude, Cérilly, Cholet, Embrun, Étampes, Figeac, Lannemezan, Lavelanet, Nantes, Saint-Malo and more rural areas, in France; Cuneo, in Italy
August	Adelaide, Brisbane, Canberra, Melbourne, Perth, Sydney, and other cities in Australia; Kobe, Kyoto, Osaka, Tokyo, Yokohama and other cities in Japan; New Orleans, Baton Rouge, El Paso, Wichita, Savannah, Colorado Springs, and over 20 other cities in United States
October	Paris, Lyon, Marseille, Nice, Lille, Toulouse, in France; Barcelona, Madrid, Seville, Valencia, in Spain; Florence, Milan, Rome, Lake Como in Italy
November	Seattle, Baltimore, Washington, D.C., and more rural areas, in United States; Major cities in New Zealand
December	Memphis, Charleston, Birmingham, Portland (Maine), Huntington, Fargo, Sioux Falls, and more locations in United States; More areas in Australia

=== 2009 ===
Release date	Major locations added
March	London, Oxford, Cambridge, Nottingham, Derby, Sheffield, Leeds, Manchester, Bradford, Scunthorpe, Bristol, Norwich, Newcastle upon Tyne, Birmingham, Coventry, Liverpool, Southampton, York, Belfast, Carrickfergus, Larne, Newtownabbey, Cardiff, Swansea, Barry, Glasgow, Edinburgh, Dundee, Aberdeen, Arbroath, Carnoustie, Ellon, Forfar, Fraserburgh, Inverurie, Peterhead, Portlethen, Stonehaven, Westhill, in the United Kingdom; Genoa, Turin, Parma, Bologna, Bari, Livorno, Naples, Novare, Monza, Busto Arsizio, Udine, Arezzo, L'Aquila, Fiumicino, Caserta, Avellino, Bitonto, Catane, Cagliari and more locations in Italy; Oviedo, Zaragoza, Madrid, Las Rozas de Madrid, Alcobendas, Coslada, Fuenlabrada, Móstoles, Getafe, Arganda del Rey, Sabadell, Terrassa, more rural areas, in Spain; Amsterdam, Amstelveen, Rotterdam, Groningen, Spijkenisse, Volendam, Zaanstad, in the Netherlands
June	Disneyland Resort Paris, in France; Monterey Bay Coastal Bike Path, Santa Monica Pier and Third Street Promenade, in the United States
August	Bern, Zurich, Basel, Lausanne, Geneva, Neuchâtel, La Chaux-de-Fonds, Biel/Bienne, Lyss, Winterthur, Wettingen, Luzern, Thun, Vevey, Montreux and more rural areas, in Switzerland; Lisbon, Porto, Braga, Coimbra, Aveiro and more locations in Portugal; Taipei, Taichung, Keelung, Hsinchu, Yilan and more locations in Taiwan; Aosta, Domodossola, Latina and more rural areas, in Italy; Legoland California, Mazda Raceway Laguna Seca, San Diego State University, Thunderhill Raceway Park, in the United States
October	Prague, Mělník, Brandýs nad Labem-Stará Boleslav, Poděbrady, Říčany, Benešov, Příbram, Beroun, in the Czech Republic; Quebec City, Toronto, Brampton, Ottawa, Hamilton, Montreal, Kitchener, Waterloo, Halifax, Mississauga, Calgary, Banff, Metro Vancouver, Abbotsford, Chilliwack, in Canada; Asahikawa, Nagoya, Gifu, Nagasaki, Hirado, Sasebo, Tanegashima, Yakushima, Amami Ōshima, Tokunoshima, Okinawa, Miyako Islands, Asahiyama Zoo, Sapporo Dome, Maruyama Zoo, Hokkaido University, Hokkaido University Botanical Gardens, Moerenuma Park, Nakajima Park, Takino Suzuran Hillside National Government Park, Hitsujigaoka Observation Hill, Historical Village of Hokkaido, Makomanai Indoor Stadium, Skyway Country Club, Huis Ten Bosch, Kōdai-ji, in Japan; More locations in the United States
November	Mexico City, Monterrey, Guadalajara, Puebla, Cancún, Puerto Vallarta, Zapopan, Cozumel, Puebla de Zaragoza, Bucerías, Nezahualcoyotl, Azcapotzalco, Coyoacán, Tlaquepaque, Apodaca, Playa del Carmen, San Pedro Garza Garcia, Benito Juarez, Riviera Maya, Apodaca and more locations in Mexico; Honolulu and major part of Oahu, also Kahului and more locations in Maui, in the United States; Málaga, Cádiz, Córdoba, Granada, Jaén, Almería, Huelva, Jerez de la Frontera, Algeciras, El Puerto de Santa María, Marbella, El Ejido, Huesca, Teruel, Calatayud, Oviedo, Gijón, Avilés, Mieres, Palma de Mallorca and southwest of the island, Bilbao, Vitoria-Gasteiz, Islands of Gran Canaria and Santa Cruz de Tenerife, Santander, Toledo, Albacete, Ciudad Real, Cuenca, Guadalajara, Puertollano, Valladolid, León, Burgos, Salamanca, Ávila, Segovia, Zamora, Tarragona, Lleida, Girona, Vic, Olot, Figueres, Reus, Badajoz, Mérida, Cáceres, Vigo, Lugo, Ferrol, Santiago de Compostela, Pontevedra, Logroño, San Lorenzo de El Escorial, Aranjuez, Murcia, Cartagena, Lorca, Caravaca de la Cruz, Pamplona, Tudela, Alicante, Castellón de la Plana, Elche, Orihuela, Utiel, Benidorm, Alcoy, La Vall d'Uixó, Vinaròs, Benicàssim and more rural areas, in Spain; The Hague, Delft, Utrecht, Nijmegen, Arnhem, Amersfoort, Apeldoorn, Almere, Hilversum, Leiden, Eindhoven, Ede, Haarlem, 's-Hertogenbosch, Tilburg, Breda, Helmond, Bergen op Zoom, Dordrecht, Harderwijk, Leeuwarden, Veendam, Veenendaal, Venlo, Drachten, Sneek, Harlingen, Lelystad, Haarlemmermeer, Waalwijk, Oss and more rural areas, in Netherlands
December	Major part of Singapore; Edmonton, Victoria, London, Greater Sudbury, Sherbrooke, Saskatoon, St. John's, Winnipeg, in Canada; Niigata, Sado, Hiroshima, Okayama, Fukuoka, Kumamoto, in Japan; Pedestrian streets and landmarks in Olomouc, Ostrava and Český Krumlov, in the Czech Republic; Pedestrian streets in Enkhuizen (Van Linschotenstraat, Wagenaarstraat and Kooizandweg), Arcen en Velden, in Netherlands; Landmarks such as Eden Project, Stonehenge, Bamburgh Castle, Warwick Castle, Kew Gardens, Lotus test track, Coronation Street set, in the United Kingdom; Tours, Le Mans, Nancy, Metz, Corsica, Belle-Île-en-Mer, Orléans, Bourges, Vierzon, Saint-Nazaire, Châteauroux, Bourg-en-Bresse, Montbrison, Roanne, Colmar, Mulhouse, Besançon, Annemasse, Chambéry, Avignon, Saint-Tropez, Fréjus, Annecy, Palace of Versailles area (including the Grand Trianon and Petit Trianon) and other locations, in France; Pompeii, Battipaglia, Siena, Urbino, San Gimignano, Sestri Levante, Asti, Biella, Vercelli, central Benevento, Pontecagnano Faiano, Casertavecchia, some places in Ischia Island and other locations, in Italy; SeaWorld (for Orlando, San Antonio, and San Diego), Boston University, Hersheypark, Universal Studios Hollywood, in the United States

=== 2010 ===
Release date	Major locations added
January	Royal Leamington Spa, Wicken Fen, Berrington Hall, Baddesley Clinton, Lyme Park, Quarry Bank Mill, Malham Cove, Studley Royal Park, Lindisfarne Castle, Avebury Manor & Garden, Corfe Castle, Glendurgan Garden, Angel of the North, Plas Newydd, Inverness, Muir of Ord, surroundings of Loch Ness, Largs, Mussenden Temple, Downhill House, Mount Stewart and main roads between towns photographed in United Kingdom. Stockholm, Malmö, Lund, Gothenburg, Öckerö, Halmstad, Västerås, Eskilstuna, Nyköping, Uppsala, Norrköping, Jönköping, Linköping, Örebro, Borås, Växjö, Kalmar, Hässleholm, Helsingborg, Skövde, Kristianstad, Karlskrona, Umeå, Piteå, Skellefteå, Luleå, Kalix, Haparanda, parts of Gotland, Fårö, Öland Islands, road connections between major cities and other in Sweden; Copenhagen Aarhus, Odense, Aalborg, Randers, Horsens, Skagen, Vejle, Kolding, Roskilde, Aabenraa, Hillerød, Slagelse, Esbjerg, Padborg, Sønderborg, Helsingør, Samsø Island, Ærø, Rømø, Fanø, Læsø and road connections and more locations in Denmark.
February	Oslo, Bergen, Fredrikstad, Moss, Sarpsborg, Drammen, Voss, Stavanger, Kristiansand, and road connections & various locations in Norway; Helsinki, Lahti, Espoo, Vantaa, Tampere, Hyvinkää, Nokia, Mänttä-Vilppula, Hämeenkyrö, Kankaanpää, Valkeakoski, Akaa, Rauma, Uusikaupunki, Lohja, Raseborg, Orimattila, Huittinen, Vaasa, Joensuu, Turku, Salo, Porvoo, Kokkola, Kuusamo, Loviisa, Forssa, Oulu, Raahe, Seinäjoki, Kauhajoki, Kurikka, Ilmajoki, Iisalmi, Pori, Rovaniemi, Tornio, Kuopio, Jyväskylä, Kotka, Savonlinna, Hämeenlinna, Kouvola, Lappeenranta, Imatra, Lieksa, Kajaani, Mikkeli, Jakobstad, road connections between cities, rural areas and more locations in Finland; Whistler Blackcomb, venues of the 2010 Winter Olympics, Yellowknife, Windsor, Sydney, Charlottetown, Prince Albert, Whitehorse, Inuvik, Regina, Chicoutimi, Nanaimo, Courtenay, Powell River, Kelowna, Kamloops, Lethbridge, Lloydminster, Thunder Bay, Timmins, Haines, Val-d'Or, Trois-Rivières, Woodstock, New Glasgow, Bathurst, Miramichi, Summerside, Collingwood, Manitoulin Island, Englehart, Prince George, Barrie, Owen Sound, Leamington, Kingston, and other locations in Canada Hermosillo, Tijuana, Ensenada, San Luis Río Colorado, La Paz, Nogales, Guaymas, Ciudad Obregón, Ciudad Juárez, Chihuahua, Delicias, Parral, Saltillo, Gómez Palacio, and other cities and regions in Mexico; Part of Åland including Mariehamn, Kumlinge, Sottunga, Brändö, Eckerö, Finström, Föglö, Hammarland, Jomala, Kökar, Lumparland, Saltvik, Vårdö and other places of Swedish-speaking region of Finland.
March	Bath, Blackpool, Doncaster, Dorchester, Exeter, Folkestone, Gainsborough, Gloucester, Grange-over-Sands, Grimsby, Harlow, Hartlepool, Lancaster, Leicester, Middlesbrough, Morecambe, Northampton, Stoke-on-Trent, Sunderland, Swindon, Wolverhampton, Worcester, and other cities in England; Abergavenny, Abergele, Buckley, Colwyn Bay, Connah's Quay, Holyhead, Holywell, Kidwelly, Knighton, Llandysul, Llanelli, Newbridge, Newcastle Emlyn, Newport, New Quay, Newtown, Port Talbot, Prestatyn, Risca, Tonypandy, Wrexham, and other cities in Wales; Derry, Ballycastle, Newtownards, Portadown, Portrush, Portstewart, Warrenpoint, and other cities in Northern Ireland; Livingston, Paisley, Stirling, Coatbridge, Irvine, Dumbarton, Peterhead, Grangemouth, Blantyre, Johnstone, Buckhaven, Port Glasgow, other cities in Scotland, and most of the remaining roads in the United Kingdom; Maastricht, Kerkrade, Geleen, Heerlen, Roermond, Almelo, Enschede, Hengelo, Texel and most of road connections, in Netherlands Nijō Castle, Nishi Honganji, Higashi Honganji, Shōseien, Daikaku-ji, Tōfuku-ji, Kennin-ji, Eikan-dō Zenrin-ji, Ritsumeikan University, Kyoto Seika University, Otani University, Aizuwakamatsu Castle, Yomiuriland, Fuji-Q Highland, Tsukiji Hongan-ji, Kumamoto Castle, Rikkyo University, Kyushu University, Kumamoto University, Fuji Golf Course, Aizu Matsudaira's Royal Garden, Himeji and more locations in Japan; Major part of Hong Kong including Victoria Harbour; Part of Macau
April	Smaller cities, rural areas, and tourist attractions in Mexico; Alton Towers, Legoland Windsor, Chessington World of Adventures, Thorpe Park, Sea Life Centre (Weymouth), in United Kingdom
June	Johannesburg, Soweto, Roodepoort, Krugersdorp, Randfontein, Kempton Park, Benoni, Vosloorus, Katlehong, Centurion, Pretoria, Bronkhorstspruit, Midrand, Middelburg, Vanderbijlpark, Sasolburg, Heidelberg, Kroonstad, Cape Town, Kuils River, Mitchells Plain, Fish Hoek, Somerset West, Durbanville, Kraaifontein, Stellenbosch, Melkbosstrand, Kleinmond, Durban, Port Elizabeth, East London, Bloemfontein, Polokwane, Nelspruit, Rustenburg, Johannesburg Zoo, Apartheid Museum, Boulders Beach, Company's Gardens, Kirstenbosch National Botanical Garden, Walter Sisulu National Botanical Garden. Major cities, tourist attractions, and 2010 FIFA World Cup venues in South Africa
September	Belo Horizonte, Rio de Janeiro, São Paulo, Belo Horizonte, Duque de Caxias, Mendes, Nova Iguaçu, Belford Roxo, São João de Meriti, Niterói, São Gonçalo, Volta Redonda, Barueri, Campinas, Carapicuíba, Ferraz de Vasconcelos, Francisco Morato, Franco da Rocha, Guarulhos, Itapevi, Itaquaquecetuba, Jacareí, Jandira, Osasco, Taboão da Serra, Diadema, Santo André, São Bernardo do Campo, São Caetano do Sul, Contagem, Betim, Sete Lagoas, Curvelo, Diamantina, Ouro Preto, Congonhas and other major cities in Brazil; Dublin, Cork, Limerick, Galway, Waterford and most of roads in Republic of Ireland; Hilo and major part of Hawaii Island, some mainland updates, in United States; Half Moon Island in the South Shetland Islands, in Antarctica (the last of the seven continents to be covered)
November	Part of Oberstaufen and landmarks as: Bundestag and Victory's Column (Berlin); Königsplatz (Munich); Köhlbrandbrücke (Hamburg); Theaterplatz (Dresden), Castle Solitude (Stuttgart). Adding to it, football stadiums were added: Allianz Arena, Fritz-Walter-Stadion, Imtech Arena, Millerntor-Stadion, Signal Iduna Park, Arena AufSchalke, Volkswagen Arena, BayArena, Badenova-Stadion, Rhein-Energie Stadion, in Germany and more locations in Berlin, Bielefeld, Bochum, Bonn, Bremen, Dortmund, Dresden, Duisburg, Düsseldorf, Essen, Frankfurt, Hamburg, Hanover, Cologne, Leipzig, Mannheim, Munich, Nuremberg, Stuttgart, Wuppertal, in Germany; Frogner Park
December	Bucharest, and other cities and towns in Romania; Trondheim and other major cities and towns in Norway; Bornholm and more, in Denmark; Terschelling and more rural areas, in Netherlands; More locations in South Africa

=== 2011 ===
Release date	Major locations added
February	World museums through Art Project including: Tretyakov Gallery, Hermitage Museum, in Russia; Alte Nationalgalerie, Gemäldegalerie, in Germany; Freer Gallery of Art, Frick Collection, Metropolitan Museum of Art, Museum of Modern Art, in United States; Museo Nacional Centro de Arte Reina Sofía, Thyssen-Bornemisza Museum, in Spain; Museum Kampa, in Czech Republic; National Gallery (later removed), Tate Britain, in United Kingdom; Palace of Versailles, in France; Uffizi, in Italy; Van Gogh Museum, Rijksmuseum, in Netherlands; Balboa Park, Pichetti Ranch Winery, Fremont Older Open Space Preserve, Russian Ridge Open Space Preserve, Rancho San Antonio Open Space Preserve, Lake Cunningham Park, University of San Diego, Worcester Polytechnic Institute, Three Rivers Heritage Trail, in United States; Palace of Caserta and Tunghai University, in Taiwan.
March	National Botanic Gardens, Powerscourt Golf Club, in Republic of Ireland; Hiroshima Peace Memorial Park, Itsukushima Shrine, Mazda Stadium, in Japan; Roman Forum, Colosseum, Palatine Hill, Appian Way, Baths of Diocletian, Piazza del Duomo, Palazzo Pitti, Boboli Gardens, Baths of Caracalla, Villa d'Este, in Italy; Palace of Fontainebleau, in France
April	Bonin Islands, Senso-ji, the Sumida River, several large parks in Tokyo and other locations, in Japan
May	Château de Chenonceau, Château d'Ussé, Château de Villandry, Château d'Amboise, in France
June	Major part of Isle of Man; Major part of Jersey; Menorca, rest of Majorca, Lanzarote, Fuerteventura and other locations, in Spain
July	Monte Carlo, Fontvieille, La Condamine, in Monaco; Update with HD images in various locations in Australia
August	National Museum of Iraq, in Iraq; Landmarks including Three Castles of Bellinzona, the shore of Caumasee, Zermatt ski resort, and other locations, in Switzerland
September	Brasília, Curitiba, Porto Alegre, Paranaguá, Santa Maria, São Joaquim, Lajeado, Ponta Grossa, Lages, Bagé, Santana do Livramento, Joinville, Santa Cecília, Cascavel, Toledo, Florianópolis, Londrina, Pelotas, Lages, Águas de Lindóia, Americana, Araçariguama, Araçoiaba da Serra, Araras, Araucária, Araxá, Atibaia, Barbacena, Biritiba Mirim, Boituva, Bragança Paulista, Cabreúva, Cachoeirinha, Campina Grande do Sul, Campo Largo, Campo Limpo Paulista, Canoas, Capivari, Caraguatatuba, Caxias do Sul, Cerquilho, Charqueada, Cordeirópolis, Elias Fausto, Guararema, Holambra, Igaratá, Ilhabela, Indaiatuba, Ipeúna, Iracemápolis, Itanhaém, Itapira, Itatiba, Itupeva, Jarinu, Jaraguá do Sul, Joinville, Laranjal Paulista, Limeira, Lindóia, Maringá, Mogi Guaçu, Mogi Mirim, Monte Mor, Montes Claros, Morungaba, Nazaré Paulista, Nova Odessa, Patos de Minas, Paulínia, Pedreira, Peruíbe, Piedade, Pindamonhangaba, Piracaia, Piracicaba, Pirapora do Bom Jesus, Poços de Caldas, Porto Feliz, Rio Claro, Rio das Pedras, Rio do Sul, Salto de Pirapora, Santa Bárbara d'Oeste, Santana de Parnaíba, Santana do Livramento, São Bento do Sul, São José dos Campos, São José dos Pinhais, São Luís do Paraitinga, São Pedro, São Sebastião, Serra Negra, Sorocaba, Sumaré, Taubaté, Tietê, Tuiuti, Ubatuba, Uberaba, Valinhos, Várzea Paulista, Vinhedo, Votorantim in Brazil.
October	Swiss Alps Railways in Switzerland
November	Brussels, Antwerp, Ghent, Charleroi, Liège, Bruges, Schaerbeek, Namur, Anderlecht, Leuven, Mons, Molenbeek-Saint-Jean, Mechelen, Ixelles, Aalst, La Louvière, Uccle, Kortrijk, Hasselt, Sint-Niklaas, Ostend, Tournai, Genk, Seraing, Roeselare, Verviers, Mouscron, Bobbejaanland, Plopsaland and almost all places in Belgium; Egeskov Castle, Knuthenborg Safaripark, Amager Strandpark and more places in Denmark; High Line Park, Liberty Park, Six Flags Great Adventure, Grant Park, Millennium Park, Lincoln Park Zoo, Northerly Island, Jackson Park, Humboldt Park, Garfield Park, Washington Park, Rochester Institute of Technology, Detroit Zoo, Stanford University, in United States; Kensington Gardens, London Zoo, Longleat Safari Park, Greenwich Park, Green Park, Greenwich University, Richmond Park, Bushy Park, Blackpool Pleasure Beach, Chain Pier, Paignton Pier, Land's End, Royal Victoria Park, Mount Edgcumbe House, in United Kingdom; Koganei Park, Space World, Kiyomizu-dera, Ryoan-ji, in Japan; Casa de Campo, Buen Retiro Park, Parque del Oeste and other parks in Madrid, in Spain; Keukenhof, Efteling, Archeon, Diergaarde Blijdorp, Apenheul Primate Park, Netherlands Open Air Museum, Dutch Water Dreams, in Netherlands; Parc Astérix, Futuroscope, Vulcania, in France; Gröna Lund, Skansen, Skånes Djurpark, Nordens Ark, Kolmården Wildlife Park, Slottsskogen, Gothenburg Botanical Garden, Liseberg, in Sweden; Singapore Flyer, in Singapore
December	Hachinohe, Aomori, Morioka, Ōfunato, Kamaishi, Miyako, Rikuzentakata, Ishinomaki, Kesennuma, Natori, Higashimatsushima, Onagawa, Minamisanriku, Yamamoto, Sōma, Watari and more places affected by the 2011 Tōhoku earthquake and tsunami, in Japan

=== 2012 ===
Release date	Major locations added
January	Seoul, Busan, in South Korea; Visaginas, Birštonas, Druskininkai, Neringa, Palanga, Anykščiai, Kaišiadorys, Vievis, Radviliškis, Vilnius, more locations and updates Lithuania; Isola d'Elba, in Italy
February	Gaborone, Francistown, more locations & landmarks in Botswana such as the Chobe National Park, Makgadikgadi salt pans Selected Japanese caves and mines including Okubo-mabu and Akiyoshi-do limestone cavern, in Japan; Moscow, Domodedovo, Podolsk, Khimki, Mytishchi, Vidnoye, Saint Petersburg, part of Kazan and some landmarks as Trinity Lavra of St. Sergius in Sergiyev Posad, in Russia; Piotrkowska Street in Łódź, in Poland; Update with HD images in various locations in New Zealand and United States
March	Bangkok, Chiang Mai, Phuket, in Thailand; Warsaw, Kraków, Łódź, Wrocław, Oleśnica, Gmina Oława, Poznań, Gdańsk, Szczecin, Lublin, Białystok, Gdynia, Sopot, Gniezno, Świnoujście landmarks as Malbork Castle, Będzin Castle, Biskupin, Jastarnia, Hel and more, in Poland; Part of Negro River and some nearby settlements, in Brazil; Part of Rhaetian Railway, Albula Railway, Bernina railway in Switzerland; Several train stations in London, Edinburgh, Glasgow, Leeds including the Cannon Street station, Charing Cross Station, Edinburgh Waverley Station, Euston Station, Fenchurch Station, Glasgow Central station, Leeds Station, Liverpool Lime Street Station, London Bridge station, London Victoria station, Manchester Piccadilly station, London Paddington station
April	Jerusalem, Tel Aviv, Haifa, and some landmarks as Jerusalem Biblical Zoo, Ramat Gan Safari, Mini Israel, Ben-Gurion University of the Negev, Kafr Kanna, Kibbutz Merhavia, Nahsholim, in Israel; Al-Ram, in Palestine; Kyiv, Donetsk, Lviv, Kharkiv, Odesa, in Ukraine; Main cities, tourist sites and more places around the country, towns like Rio Branco and more places in the State of Acre
May	Tallinn, Tartu, Narva, Pärnu, Viljandi, Jõhvi, Abja-Paluoja, Antsla, Elva, Haapsalu, Jõgeva, Kallaste, Kärdla, Karksi-Nuia, Kehra, Keila, Kilingi-Nõmme, Kiviõli, Kohtla-Järve, Kunda, Kuressaare, Lihula, Loksa, Maardu, Mõisaküla, Mustvee, Narva-Jõesuu, Otepää, Paide, Paldiski, Põltsamaa, Põlva, Püssi, Rakvere, Räpina, Rapla, Saue, Sillamäe, Sindi, Suure-Jaani, Tamsalu, Tapa, Tõrva, Türi, Valga, Võhma, Võru and more areas, in Estonia; Riga, Daugavpils, Bauska, Cēsis, Dobele, Jēkabpils, Krāslava, Jelgava, Jūrmala, Kuldīga, Liepāja, Ogre, Olaine, Rēzekne, Salaspils, Saldus, Sigulda, Talsi, Tukums, Valmiera, Ventspils and more areas, in Latvia; UEFA Euro 2012 stadiums, in Poland and Ukraine; Indianapolis Motor Speedway, in United States; Manaus
June	Ostrava, Plzeň, Liberec, Olomouc, Ústí nad Labem, Hradec Králové, České Budějovice, Pardubice, Havířov, Zlín, Kladno, Most, Karviná, Frýdek-Místek, Opava, Karlovy Vary, Teplice, Děčín, Jihlava, Chomutov, Přerov, Mladá Boleslav, Sedlec Ossuary, Terezín, Lidice, Ležáky, Fortress Josefov and almost all places in the Czech Republic. Hawaiian Islands Molokai, Lana'i, Kauaʻi, and updates to Oahu, Maui, The big island such as Hawaiʻi Volcanoes National Park, in United States. Barranquilla, Medellín, Bogotá, Cali, Manizales, Pereira, Armenia more locations and updates in Colombia
July	Landmarks in Antarctica including Ceremonial South Pole, Shackleton's Hut, Discovery Hut; Olympic Park, Olympia Exhibition Hall, ExCeL London, O_{2} Arena, Earls Court Exhibition Centre, Liverpool Lime Street railway station, Manchester Piccadilly station, Leeds railway station, Glasgow Central station, Edinburgh Waverley railway station, Silverstone Circuit, Downing Street and more, in United Kingdom; National parks in California, in United States; San Marino, Borgo Maggiore, Chiesanuova, Domagnano, Faetano, Fiorentino, Montegiardino, Serravalle, in San Marino
August	Kennedy Space Center, in United States; Brasília, Salvador, Fortaleza, Natal, Recife, Foz do Iguaçu (including Itaipu Dam), Goiânia, Cuiabá, Campo Grande, Corumbá, Uberlândia, São Luís, Teresina, Sinop, Mossoró and more, in Brazil; HD update in parts of Louisiana and South Carolina, in United States; Mesoamerican archaeological sites including Teotihuacan, Tulum, Chichen Itza, Ek' Balam, Kohunlich, Dzibanche, Palenque, Dzibilchaltun, Plazuelas, Peralta, Bonampak, Becan and others, in Mexico
September	Japan Aerospace Exploration Agency, National Museum of Emerging Science and Innovation, Tanegashima Space Center, Tsukuba Space Center, Sagamihara Campus, Chofu Aerospace Center, Earth Observation Center, Usuda Deep Space Center and Uchinoura Space Center, in Japan; Greater Santiago (including ski resorts), Greater Valparaíso (including Limache) and Greater Concepción, Chile; Zagreb, Pula, Split, Zadar, Dubrovnik, Rijeka, Osijek, Šibenik, Varaždin, Karlovac, Krk, Bjelovar, Slavonski Brod, Đakovo, Virovitica, and other locations in Croatia; Andorra la Vella, Canillo, Encamp, Escaldes-Engordany, La Massana, Ordino, Sant Julià de Lòria and other locations in Andorra; Underwater imagery in Australia, Philippines and Hawaii (United States); Various university campuses around the world: Canada, Japan, United Kingdom, United States
October	Landmarks in Russia; Updated images in many parts of Canada and new images of some parks, trails, university campuses and zoos More locations in: Canada, Denmark, Italy, Macau, Norway, Singapore, Sweden, Taiwan, Thailand, United Kingdom, United States; Google Data Center in Lenoir, North Carolina, United States. Bratislava, Košice, Prešov, Žilina, Nitra, Banská Bystrica, Trnava, Martin, Trenčín, Poprad, Prievidza, Zvolen, Považská Bystrica, Nové Zámky, Michalovce, Spišská Nová Ves and more in Slovakia
November	More Canadian locations including Cambridge Bay and tourist sites. Svalbard, in Norway; Ski resorts including Solden and Ischgl in Austria; Ski resorts in Italy; Ski resorts in Spain, including Sierra Nevada; Ski resorts in Switzerland including Davos; Luna Park Sydney, Taronga Zoo, in Australia
December	Major part of Gibraltar; Ateneum in Finland

=== 2013 ===
Release date	Major locations added
January	Rishon LeZion, Petah Tikva, Ashdod, Beersheba, Holon, Netanya, Bnei Brak, Ramat Gan, Bat Yam, Rehovot, Ashkelon, Herzliya, Kfar Saba, Hadera, Nazareth, Lod, Ra'anana, Ramla, Giv'atayim, Rahat, Nahariya, Kiryat Ata, Eilat, Kiryat Gat, Hod HaSharon, Acre, Karmiel, Tiberias, Ramat HaSharon, Afula, Jordan Valley and more, in Israel; Palestinian cities, tourist sites and other locations. Vilnius, Kaunas, Klaipėda, Šiauliai, Panevėžys, Alytus, Marijampolė, Mažeikiai, Jonava, Utena, Kėdainiai, Telšiai, Visaginas, Tauragė, Ukmergė, Plungė, Šilutė, Kretinga, Radviliškis, Druskininkai and other locations in Lithuania; Updated HD images in United States, including new 'walking' imagery inside the Grand Canyon and Meteor Crater
February	Lucas Oil Stadium in United States; Ski resorts in United States, in Utah and Michigan; Nagano, Ueda, Maebashi, Fukui and other locations in Japan including various HD images updates
March	Plovdiv, Varna, Veliko Turnovo and more locations in Bulgaria; Sochi and more locations in Russia; Updates to various cities in Portugal; More locations in United States and HD imagery updates of California, Idaho, Indiana, and Utah; Some updates in United Kingdom; Uhuru Peak, Lava Tower, Moir Hut, Arrow Glacier Camp, Lemosho Glades, Shira Camp on Mount Kilimanjaro in Tanzania; West Summit, Barrel Huts, Diesel Hut on Mount Elbrus, Russia; Aconcagua Summit, Camp Colera, Camp 1 and 2, Plaza Argentina, Casa de Piedra, Pampa de Leñas, Argentina; South Base Camp on Mount Everest, Tengboche Monastery, Kala Patthar, Mudslide bridge between Lukla and Namche Bazaar, Stupa in Namche Bazaar, in Nepal; Mount Fuji, Namie Japan
April	Maseru, Roma, Mafeteng, Mohale's Hoek and other locations in Lesotho; Budapest, Debrecen, Szeged, Miskolc, and other cities in Hungary; Częstochowa, Radom, Sosnowiec, Toruń, and other cities in Poland; Timișoara, Iași, Cluj-Napoca and other cities in Romania; Pantelleria, part of Lampedusa and more locations in Italy; Kaliningrad Oblast and other locations in Russia; More locations in France; More locations in Singapore; Pattaya, Chon Buri, Sattahip, Lamphun, Lampang and other locations in Thailand; Pena National Palace in Portugal; Sha Tin Che Kung Temple and Ocean Park in Hong Kong; Kilkenny Castle in Ireland
May	National September 11 Memorial & Museum, Central Park, update parts of New York City hit by Hurricane Sandy and HD imagery updates of the state of New York in United States
June	Campus Curicó in the University of Talca; Over 1,000 tourist spots, including destinations in: Brazil, Canada, Chile, Denmark, Mexico, Singapore, Spain, United States. Burj Khalifa, in United Arab Emirates; Hashima Island, in Japan; Pitcairn Islands
July	Parliament of Canada; More locations in United States and HD updates for large parts of nearly every state Diagon Alley movie set and Warner Bros. Studio Tour; Iqaluit in Canada; 16, Rue de la Loi (Prime Minister Office) and Lambermont (Prime Minister Residence), in Belgium; Eiffel Tower, in Paris, France; Mount Fuji trails, in Japan; Kinmen in Taiwan
August	Inside views of an Airbus A380 Emirates plane at Dubai International Airport in United Arab Emirates. Lima, Trujillo, Chiclayo, Piura, Arequipa, Cusco and more locations in Peru; Arica, Iquique, Calama, San Pedro de Atacama, Antofagasta, Taltal, Chañaral, Caldera, Copiapó, Vallenar, La Serena, Coquimbo, Ovalle, Andacollo, Combarbalá, Illapel, Salamanca, San Felipe, Los Andes, Quintero, Quillota, Concón, Casablanca, San Antonio, Rancagua, Curicó, Talca, Linares, Los Angeles, Nacimiento, Temuco, Osorno, Puerto Varas, Puerto Montt, Calbuco, Ancud, Coyhaique, Aysén, extended coverage Greater Santiago and more locations in Chile; TARDIS from the television programme Doctor Who in London; More locations and some updates in Finland; Sula Vineyards, Indian Institute of Technology Bombay, Indian Institute of Technology Delhi in India; Chengdu Research Base of Giant Panda Breeding in China; Houston Zoo in United States; Chapultepec Zoo in Mexico; Americana Zoo & Municipal Zoo of Bauru in Brazil; Asahiyama Zoo in Asahikawa; Shou Shan Zoo in Gushan; Taronga Zoo in Sydney; Singapore Zoo; Zoo Safari Park Stukenbrock; Batu Caves, Dhammikarama Burmese Temple, Fort Cornwallis, Kapitan Keling Mosque, Putra Square, Sultan Salahuddin Abdul Aziz Mosque, Sunway Lagoon, Titiwangsa Lake Garden and more parks in Klang Valley, in Malaysia. Cyber Pearl, The Ascendas IT Park and ISB in Hyderabad, India
September	Bogotá, Barranquilla, Cartagena, Cúcuta, Bucaramanga, Yopal, Montería, Villavicencio, Valledupar, Neiva, Barrancabermeja, Zipaquirá, Floridablanca, Manizales, Chinchiná, Updated imagery of 17 cities within the Iwate and Miyagi Prefectures, and new areas within the Fukushima Exclusion Zone, including the abandoned towns Ōkuma and Futaba, in Japan; Manufacture Moto X in Texas, United States; Swiss Alpine Club cabins in the Alps; Wieliczka Salt Mine; Schmidt Ocean Falkor Boat; Galápagos Islands in Ecuador; Some CERN sites including Large Hadron Collider, ALICE, ATLAS and more others Abaetetuba, Acaraú, Adamantina, Agrestina, Águas de Chapecó, Altinho, Ananindeua, Anápolis, Anastácio, Aracati, Araripina, Arcoverde, Ariquemes, Barra do Garças, Bela Vista, Belém, Boa Vista, Bonito, Bragança, Caarapó, Cáceres, Cacoal, Caicó, Cajazeiras, Camapuã, Campo Maior, Canindé, Cansanção, Carneirinho, Castanhal, Cidelândia, Cipó, Conceição do Araguaia, Coxim, Crateús, Cristalina, Cunha Porã, Descanso, Eldorado dos Carajás, Frederico Westphalen, Guaraí, Gurupi, Icó, Iguatu, Inhumas, Inocência, Ipameri, Iporã do Oeste, Iraceminha, Itapiranga, Jaraguá, Ji-Paraná, Júlio de Castilhos, Jussara, Lago da Pedra, Lago do Junco, Lago dos Rodrigues, Luís Correia, Macapá, Manaus, Massapê, Miguel Alves, Miranorte, Modelo, Monteiro, Nerópolis, Niquelândia, Nova Erechim, Nova Russas, Nova Veneza, Orós, Ouro Verde de Goiás, Palmares, Palmitos, Paraguaçu Paulista, Paraíso do Tocantins, Parnaíba, Parnamirim, Peixe, Pesqueira, Petrolina de Goiás, Pimenta Bueno, Pinhalzinho, Porangatu, Porto Nacional, Porto Velho, Queimadas, Rancharia, Redenção, Reriutaba, Ribas do Rio Pardo, Rio Branco, Rio Brilhante, Rolim de Moura, Rondonópolis, Santa Helena, Santa Inês, Santa Quitéria, Santa Rosa de Goiás, Santana do Acaraú, São Benedito, São João do Oeste, São Miguel do Oeste, São Raimundo Nonato, Sarandi, Saudades, Serra Alta, Serra Talhada, Sertânia, Sorriso, Sul Brasil, Tabuleiro do Norte, Tianguá, Tucuruí, Tunápolis, Tutóia, União, Uruaçu, Verdejante, Vila Nova dos Martírios, Vilhena, Vitória de Santo Antão, Vitória do Mearim in Brazil.
October	Reykjavík, Kópavogur, Hafnarfjörður, Akureyri, Keflavík, Mosfellsbær, Akranes, Selfoss and more locations in Iceland; Main cities and tourist sites and more existing places in Eswatini; Main cities and tourist sites and more existing places in Thames, HMS Ocelot, London-Gatwick Airport
November	Fortress of Louisbourg, Gulf Islands National Park Reserve, Skyline Trail of Cape Breton Highlands National Park and other locations in Canada; Mexico City International Airport; Adolfo Suárez Madrid–Barajas Airport; Tokyo International Airport; Venice and more locations in Italy; Circuit of the Americas and updated areas in the United States; Catacomb of Priscilla in Rome, Italy; National Mall in Washington, D.C., as well as the Marine Corps War Memorial, The Alamo (San Antonio), walking paths in Yellowstone National Park, Sequoia National Park, Grand Teton National Park, Arches National Park, Mount Rushmore, Devils Tower National Monument, Badlands National Park, Joshua Tree National Park, Signal Mountain, and other locations in the USA
December	Villa Ephrussi de Rothschild, Musée des arts et métiers Sheikh Zayed Grand Mosque; Office of the Canadian Prime Minister; Île Vache Marine, Peros Banhos, British Indian Ocean Territory; Adamstown, Henderson Island in Pitcairn Islands; Cape Royds, Castle Rock Loop Trail, WISSARD Test Site, Arena Valley, Lake Bonney, McMurdo Station, Taylor Valley, Bull Pass, Wright Valley in Antarctica; Pearl and Hermes Atoll, Lisianski Island, Laysan, Tern Island, East Island in Hawaii, United States

=== 2014 ===
Release date	Major locations added
January	Yakutsk, Sochi, Irkutsk, Khabarovsk, Krasnaya Polyana, Artyom, Belebey, Borovichi, Buzuluk, Gubkin, Kandalaksha, Kingisepp, Korocha, Korsakov, Labinsk, Langepas, Magadan, Nakhodka, Nazarovo, Pochep, Revda, Rostov-on-Don, Suzdal, Tobolsk, Tsivilsk, Ukhta, Vyazma, Zarinsk in Russia; Ajdovščina, Bled, Bovec, Brežice, Celje, Črnomelj, Domžale, Gornja Radgona, Hrastnik, Idrija, Ilirska Bistrica, Izola, Jesenice, Kamnik, Kočevje, Koper, Kostanjevica ob Krki, Kranj, Krško, Laško, Lendva, Litija, Ljubljana, Ljutomer, Maribor, Metlika, Novo Mesto Postojna, Ptuj, Radeče, Radovljica, Ravne na Koroškem, Sevnica, Sežana, Slovenska Bistrica, Slovenj Gradec, Slovenske Konjice, Škofja Loka, Šoštanj, Tolmin, Trbovlje, Tržič, Velenje, Višnja Gora, Vrhnika, Zagorje ob Savi, Žalec, Cerknica, Dravograd, Grosuplje, Logatec, Medvode, Mengeš, Mežica, Prevalje, Ribnica, Rogaška Slatina, Ruše, Šempeter pri Gorici, Šentjur, Trebnje, Železniki, Žiri in Slovenia; National Parks among them are the Conguillío National Park, Laguna San Rafael National Park, Alerce Andino National Park and Laguna del Laja National Park in Chile. Fort Santiago, San Agustin Church, Plaza San Luis Complex & Baluarte de San Diego in the Philippines. Qutub Minar, Tomb of I'timād-ud-Daulah, Raigad Fort, Shaniwar Wada, Rajagiri Fort, Kanheri Caves, Thirumayam Fort, Fort St. George, India, Aga Khan Palace, Karla Caves, Lenyadri Caves, Movar Koil and Alvar Koil, Sithanavasal Caves; Tuol Sleng Genocide Museum in Cambodia.
February	Red Fort, Jantar Mantar, Agha Khan Palace, Raigad Fort, Fort St George, Bibi Ka Maqbara & Qutub Minar in India. Knesset; Ducati Museum in Italy; Churchill, Manitoba, in Canada
March	Palais Garnier in Paris; Ajanta Caves, Aurangabad Caves, Elephanta Caves, Jetavana, The Residency, Lucknow, Lord Cornwallis tomb in India; Angkor Wat, Angkor Thom, Ta Prohm, Banteay Srei and more landmarks in Cambodia New Island, Carcass Island and West Point Island in the Falkland Islands Right Whale Bay, Hercules Bay and Prion Island in the South Georgia and South Sandwich Islands
April	Landmarks in the United Kingdom, including waterways such as Pontcysyllte Aqueduct, Bingley Five Rise Locks, and Little Venice. Several wineries such as Château Lafon-Rochet, Château La Conseillante, Château Coutet, Château Corbin Michotte, Château La Brède, Château Malle, Pressac, Château d'Agassac, Saint-Emilion and Museum of Aquitaine; San Ignacio Miní; Coverage expanded in Medellín; Chernobyl in Ukraine; Lamma Island, Cheung Chau, Peng Chau, and country trails in Hong Kong
May	Anıtkabir in Ankara, Turkey; Chernobyl in Ukraine
June	Gerhard Hanappi Stadium; 2014 FIFA World Cup venues in Brazil; Belize Barrier Reef Reserve System in Belize; Österreichring and the nearby Enduro, Gokart and 4-Wheel test tracks in Austria; Athens, Thessaloniki, Patras, Heraklion, Larissa, Volos, Rhodes, Ioannina, Chania, Chalcis, Agrinio, Katerini, Trikala, Serres, Lamia, Xanthi, Alexandroupoli, Kozani, Kavala, Kalamata, Veria, Komotini, Corfu, Mytilene, Tripoli, Mykonos, Naxos, Paros, Santorini and more locations in Greece; Tumaco, Pasto, Ipiales, Teyuna–Ciudad Perdida, places in San Andrés Island and more locations in Colombia Gombe National Park, Tanzania
July	Belgrade, Niš, Pančevo, Novi Sad and more locations in Serbia; Alnwick Castle and Edinburgh Castle in United Kingdom; Ranthambore Fort, Jaisalmer Fort, Khajuraho Group of Monuments, Lila Gumbaj Ki Masjid, Champaner, Gwalior Fort and other landmarks in India
August	36 university campuses in the United States & Canada; Phnom Penh, Siem Reap, Ta Khmao, Kampong Cham, Tboung Khmum, Sisophon, Kampong Thom, Kampot, Pursat, Banlung, Stung Treng and more locations and landmarks such as the Angkor Wat Temple in Cambodia; Jakarta, Tangerang, Depok, Bogor, Surabaya, Gresik, Denpasar, Nusa Penida and more locations in Indonesia; Various waterfalls, geysers, and trails in Iceland
September	Landmarks in Egypt including Pyramids of Giza, Cairo Citadel, Saqqara, Monastery of Saint Mina, Citadel of Qaitbay and more Alvar Aalto works in Finland including Finlandia Hall, Kulttuuritalo, Säynätsalo Town Hall and more Buenos Aires, 3 de Febrero, Almirante Brown, Alta Gracia, Avellaneda, Ayacucho, Azul, Bahía Blanca, Bariloche, Berazategui, Berisso, Brandsen, Caleta Olivia, Campana, Cañada de Gomez, Cañuelas, Capilla del Señor, Carmen de Patagones, Casilda, Chimbas, Chivilcoy, Cipolletti, Clorinda, Comodoro Rivadavia, Concepción del Uruguay, Córdoba, Corrientes, Cruz Alta, El Calafate, Ensenada, Escobar, Esquel, Esteban Echeverría, Ezeiza, Federación, Florencio Varela, Formosa, General Güemes, General Pico, General Rodríguez, Godoy Cruz, Gualeguaychú, Guaraní, Hurlingham, Ituzaingó, José C. Paz, Junín, Junín de Los Andes, La Banda, La Costa, La Matanza, La Plata, La Rioja, Lanús, Las Heras, Lomas de Zamora, Luján, Luján de Cuyo, Malvinas Argentinas, Mar del Plata, Marcos Juarez, Marcos Paz, Mendoza, Merlo, Moreno, Morón, Necochea, Neuquén, Oberá, Olavarría, Oliva, Oncativo, Orán, Palpalá, Paraná, Paso de los Libres, Pergamino, Pilar, Pocito, Posadas, Presidencia Roque Saenz Peña, Presidente Perón, Puerto Iguazú, Puerto Madryn, Quilmes, Rafaela, Rawson, Resistencia, Río Cuarto, Río Gallegos, Río Grande, Río Tercero, Rosario, Rosario de Lerma, Salta, San Antonio de Areco, San Fernando, San Fernando del Valle de Catamarca, San Francisco, San Isidro, San Juan, San Justo, San Lorenzo, San Luis, San Martín, San Martín de Los Andes, San Miguel, San Nicolás, San Pedro, San Pedro de Jujuy, San Rafael, San Salvador de Jujuy, San Vicente, Santa Fe, Santa Lucía, Santa Rosa, Santiago del Estero, Tafí Viejo, Tandil, Termas de Rio Hondo, Tigre, Trelew, Tres Arroyos, Tucumán, Ushuaia, Venado Tuerto, Vicente López, Victoria, Viedma, Villa Angela, Villa Carlos Paz, Villa Constitución, Villa Gobernador Gálvez, Villa María, Villa Mercedes, Villaguay, Zárate and more locations in Argentina; University of Regina, University of Calgary & University of Manitoba; University of Miami & University of Georgetown; More locations & landmarks in Guam; Kuala Lumpur, Klang Valley, Putrajaya, Cyberjaya, Ipoh, Penang, Kedah, Perlis, Negeri Sembilan, Seremban, Johor, Johor Bahru, Malacca, Malacca City, Pahang, Kuantan, Terengganu, Kelantan and more locations in Peninsular Malaysia
October	Thimphu, Trongsa Dzong, Wangdue Phodrang and more locations in Bhutan; Luxembourg City and more locations in Luxembourg; Camel trails near Liwa Oasis, United Arab Emirates; Seongsan Ilchulbong, Geomun Oreum, Bijarim forest, Seongsan Sunrise Peak, Manjanggul Lava Tubes, Yongduam Rock, Cheonjiyeon waterfalls, Sanbangsan Mountain, Jusangjeolli Cliffs; Opéra Garnier; Sochi Autodrom in Russia; Gombe National Park; Capitol Hill, Saipan, Garapan and more locations in the Northern Mariana Islands; Carcass Island, West Point Island, New Island in the Falkland Islands; Grytviken, Right Whale Bay, Prion Island, Hercules Bay in the South Georgia and the South Sandwich Islands; Bran Castle in Romania; The "Lake" underneath the Opéra Garnier, Paris, France; Museo della Stregoneria di Triora in Italy; Čachtice Castle in Slovakia National Museum of Western Art, National Museum of Modern Art, Ohara Museum of Art, Kobe City Museum, Kobe Fashion Museum, Saitama Prefectural Museum of the Sakitama Ancient Burial Mounds, Shizuoka Prefectural Museum of Art, Shizuoka City Tokaido Hiroshige Museum and Shohaku Art Museum in Japan Fernando de Noronha, Brazil
November	Instituto de Rehabilitación Infantil of Santiago Teletón (Chile); Romania in Brukenthal National Museum Rocas Atoll, Brazil
December	Blackness Castle, Stirling Castle, Dunfermline Palace, Edinburgh Castle & Fort George; Dubai in the United Arab Emirates

=== 2015 ===
Release date	Major locations added
January	Landmarks in Belgium including Walloon Parliament in Namur, Citadel of Dinant and Mardasson Memorial in Bastogne
February	Sylhet, Chittagong, Dhaka, Shamnagar, Khulna, Cox's Bazar, several tourist attractions, Marine Drive Rd, Beach Area and main cities, tourist sites and more places around Bangladesh; Avannaata, Ilimanaq, Ilulissat, Oqaatsut, Qaanaaq, Qeqertaq, Saqqaq, Siorapaluk, Uummannaq, Kujalleq, Narsaq, Narsarsuaq, Qaqortoq, Qassiarsuk, Northeast Greenland, Daneborg, Qeqertalik, Aasiaat, Akunnaaq, Ikamiut, Ikerasaarsuk, Ilulissat, Niaqornaarsuk, Qasigiannguit, Qeqertarsuaq, Qeqqata, Itilleq, Kangerlussuaq, Maniitsoq, Sarfannguit, Sisimiut, Kangerlussuaq, Sermersooq, Nuuk, Paamiut, Ittoqqortoormiit, Kulusuk, Tasiilaq and more locations, water views, main cities and tourist sites in Greenland
March	Queensland Museum, Australian War Memorial, National Museum of Australia, National Portrait Gallery, Powerhouse Museum, Australian Centre for the Moving Image and Public Record Office Victoria in Australia; Lukla, Phakding, Khumjung, Phortse, Panboche, Dughla, Lobuche, Thamu, Thame and more locations in Khumbu Region, Nepal; Gateway of India, Tomb of Sher Shah Suri, Nalanda, Vikramashila, Lakshmana Temple, Konark Sun Temple, Mysore Palace, Mysore Zoo, Rajarani Temple, Udayagiri Caves, Pattadakal and other landmarks in India; Punta Arenas; Juma Sustainable Development Reserve, Fernando de Noronha, Rocas Atoll in Brazil; Thasos, Gavrio, Andros, Tinos, Chios, Apollonia, Folegandros, Egina, Gaios, more locations and updates, in Greece; Water views for the Danube River in Slovakia; Hungary, Croatia, Serbia, Romania, Bulgaria. Interior view of an Air France Boeing 777 airplane at Charles de Gaulle airport, France; Indonesia: National Museum of Indonesia; United Arab Emirates: The Barjeel Art Foundation
April	Ford's Theatre and Google Cultural Institute; Water views on Loch Ness; Landmarks in Gallipoli, Turkey; Robben Island Museum, in South Africa; Ivvavik National Park, Torngat Mountains National Park, Tuktut Nogait National Park, Auyuittuq National Park in Canada; Several tourist sites in Peru among them include the Cathedral of Lima, Archbishop's Palace of Lima & Basilica of Santo Domingo
May	National Parks, monuments among the places added are the Barren Islands and Sambirano river Underwater views in Bermuda; St. Gallen, Ticino, Chur, Locarno, St. Moritz, Bellinzona and several hiking trails in Switzerland; Tijuca National Park and Fernando de Noronha Park
June	Underwater views from around the world to celebrate World Oceans Day, which included: underwater views in Jaco Island, East Timor, Papua, Indonesia, Solomon Islands, Cook Islands, Maldives, Guadeloupe, Belize, Aruba, Bonaire, Curaçao, The Bahamas, Anguilla, Turks and Caicos Islands, and Saint Vincent and the Grenadines. Locations in the British Indian Ocean Territory; Wrocław–Copernicus Airport, Wrocław Główny railway station, WUWA and views from Sněžka, in Poland; Pago Pago, Fagatogo, Tafuna, Ofu-Olosega, Manu'a, Rose Atoll and more locations in American Samoa; Salina Turda, in Romania; Views from Mount Etna in Italy; Vertical views from El Capitan in United States; Part of Lahore (including streets of Walled City), landmarks such as Lahore Fort, Lahore Museum, Shalimar Garden, Katasraj temple, Derawar Fort, Sheikhupura Fort, Quaid-e-Azam Library, Kinnaird College For Women University, Government College University, King Edward Medical University, Punjab University College of Information Technology, Hiran Minar Park, Rohtas Fort, Tomb of Jahangir and more Leh Palace in India, Murudeshwara, Chitradurga, Bhakt Singh Palace, Delhi Metro exhibit at National Science Centre, Rishikesh, Vadatalav, Gujarat; 57 monuments, including the Belém Tower, the Jerónimos Monastery and the Pena Palace
July	Ulaanbaatar, Erdenet, Darkhan, Sainshand, Bagakhangai, Bayan, Zuunmod, Baganuur, Züünbayan, Erdene, Zamyn-Üüd, Züünkharaa, Sukhbaatar, Altanbulag, Khüder, part of Mandalgovi, Lake Khövsgöl, Genghis Khan Statue, The Buddha's Statue of Northern & more landmarks in Mongolia; Main cities and tourist sites Vientiane
August	Peninsular Malaysia Coastline; Main cities and tourist sites Dún Aengus and other remote sites around the country
September	Metro Manila, Miag-ao, Paoay and more locations in the Philippines; Inside views of Airbus A318 at London City Airport in United Kingdom; Los Nevados National Natural Park, Gorgona Island National Natural Park, Otún Quimbaya Flora and Fauna Sanctuary National Natural Park, Salamanca Island Road Park and more National Parks in Colombia; Northumberland National Park, including Simonside Hills, Hadrian's Wall and the Pennine Way; Fort St. Catherine, St. David's Lighthouse, Bermuda National Sports Centre, Bermuda Botanical Gardens, Admiralty House Park, Bermuda Railway Trail, Clearwater Beach & more landmarks in Bermuda; Meteora Monastery Complex, the Balos Lagoon, Samaria Gorge & more locations in Greece; Samburu National Reserve; Chacabuco, Curuzú Cuatiá, Bell Ville, Trenque Lauquen, Bragado, Pehuajó, Villa Gesell, Baradero, General José de San Martín, Juan José Castelli, Pinamar, and expanded coverage of existing locations in Argentina.
October	Cemitério São João Batista, in Rio de Janeiro. Cemitério da Consolação, Cemitério do Araçá and Cemitério São Paulo, in São Paulo in Brazil. Skopje, Kumanovo, Ohrid, Bitola, Prilep, Veles, Strumica, Tetovo and more locations in North Macedonia; Over 300 smaller and mid-size cites in Ukraine; Various locations in Turkey; More California State Parks; Landmarks in Pristina, Kosovo, including night views of Mother Tereza Downtown; Landmarks in Malaysia, including views of Mount Kinabalu and more
November	Milford Track, Kepler Track, Abel Tasman Coast Track, Lake Waikaremoana Great Walk, Heaphy Track, Routeburn Track, Rakiura Track in New Zealand. La Paz, Santa Cruz de la Sierra, El Alto, Greater Cochabamba, Montero, Warnes, La Guardia, Viacha, Villamontes, Camiri, Punata, Cotoca, Mineros, El Torno, Portachuelo, San José de Chiquitos, Sipe Sipe, Patacamaya, Vallegrande, Laja, Irpa Irpa, Cliza, Mizque, and Aiquile in Bolivia; Quito, Guayaquil, Cuenca, Santo Domingo, Machala, Durán, Portoviejo, Manta, Loja, Ambato, Esmeraldas, Quevedo, Riobamba, Ibarra, La Libertad, Babahoyo, Daule, Latacunga, Tulcán, Chone, Pasaje, Loja, Huaquillas, El Carmen, Montecristi, Samborondón, Puerto Francisco de Orellana, Jipijapa, Santa Elena, Otavalo, Cayambe, Buena Fe, Velasco Ibarra, La Troncal, El Triunfo, Salinas, General Villamil Playas, Azogues, Vinces, La Concordia, Quinindé, Balzar, Naranjito, Guaranda, La Maná, Catamayo, El Guabo, Atuntaqui, Bahía de Caráquez, Pedro Carbo and more locations in Ecuador; Bucks County Parks: Shady Brook Farm, Nockamixon State Park, Tyler State Park, Peace Valley Lavender Farm, Core Creek Park, Bowman's Hill Wildflower Preserve, Ringing rocks, Delaware Canal State Park and many more. Landmarks in Jordan including Petra, Little Petra, Umm Qais, Beit Ras, Ajloun Forest Reserve, Ajloun Castle, Jerash Monuments, Umm el-Jimal, Amman Citadel, Roman theater, Jordan Museum, Iraq Al-Amir, The Baptismal Site, Surb Karapet Armenian Apostolic Church, Qasr Kharana, Dead Sea Panorama Complex, Machaerus, Dhiban, Karak Castle, Qasr Tuba, Shobak Castle, Aqaba Fortress, Aqaba Archaeological Museum; Istanbul Atatürk Airport, in Turkey; Boating views of the Potomac River and the Anacostia River along the Washington, D.C., coast
December	Montevideo Metropolitan Cathedral, Solís Theatre, Auditorio Nacional Adela Reta in Montevideo, Salto, Ciudad de la Costa, Paysandú, Las Piedras, Rivera, Maldonado, Tacuarembó, Melo, Mercedes, Artigas, Minas, San José de Mayo, Durazno, Barros Blancos, Ciudad del Plata, San Carlos, Colonia del Sacramento, Pando, Treinta y Tres, Rocha, Fray Bentos, Trinidad, La Paz, Canelones, Carmelo, Santa Lucía, Progreso, Paso de Carrasco, Río Branco, Paso de los Toros, Bella Unión, Libertad, Rosario, Nueva Palmira, Chuy, Punta del Este, Piriápolis, Salinas, Parque del Plata, Castillos, Sarandí del Yí, San Ramón, Tarariras, Pan de Azúcar, Sauce, Sarandí Grande, Atlántida, Cardona, San Jacinto, Toledo, Vergara, Santa Rosa, Florencio Sánchez, La Paloma, San Gregorio de Polanco, Colonia Valdense, Cerrillos, Migues, Florida, Dolores, Young, Juan Lacaze, Nueva Helvecia, Lascano, José Pedro Varela, Tala, Guichón, Ombúes de Lavalle, Aiguá, San Bautista and other cities and locations in Uruguay; Machu Picchu, Aguas Calientes, Poroy–Machu Picchu railway and more locations in Peru; Los Molinos Beach in Valdivia (39.848306°S 73.391970°W), Aulén Beach in Chiloé (42.040827°S 74.027746°W), Grande Beach in Niebla (39.863989°S 73.396066°W) and other beaches in Chile

=== 2016 ===
Release date	Major locations added
January	Main cities including Kampala and Entebbe, tourist sites and more places around the country Miniatur Wunderland in Hamburg, Germany; Mont Blanc in France/Italy; Palace of the Parliament in Bucharest, Romania; Israel National Trail; Darkhan Central Library, Khurel Togoot Planetarium, National Academic Drama Theatre, Khangarid Palace, Ulaanbaatar Central Swimming Pool and more locations in Mongolia
February	Saint-Denis, Saint-Louis and more locations in Réunion; More locations in Ukraine; Quito, Guayaquil, Cuenca, Santo Domingo, Machala, Durán, Portoviejo, Manta, Loja, Ambato, Esmeraldas, Quevedo, Riobamba, Ibarra, La Libertad, Babahoyo, Daule, Latacunga, Tulcán, Chone, Loja, Huaquillas, Santa Elena, Cayambe, General Villamil and major roads in Ecuador Magic Kingdom, Epcot
March	Nome, Unalakleet, Galena, Iditarod Trail Sled Dog Race in United States; Kruger National Park in South Africa; North Downs Way and other walking paths in the UK; Colombo, Dehiwala-Mount Lavinia, Moratuwa, Jaffna, and more locations in Sri Lanka; Umm Al Quwain in the United Arab Emirates; Bruce Wayne's Residence in Orion Township, Michigan, United States; Beaches in Krabi Province, Ko Pha Ngan, Ko Tao and more locations in Thailand; Cagayan de Oro and more locations in the Philippines; Yu Shan
April	Pripyat (Chernobyl Exclusion Zone) in Ukraine; Sydney Opera House; Wat Chaiwatthanaram
May	Bishkek, Jalal-Abad, Osh, Naryn, Karakol and more locations in Kyrgyzstan; National parks in Argentina. Kangiqsualujjuaq and Nain in Canada. Rio 2016 Summer Olympic and Paralympic Games venues Skåneleden trail in Skåne County; Moresby Island, Nelsons Island, Danger Island and more islands in the British Indian Ocean Territory
June	Rajshahi, Barisal, Sylhet, Rangpur, and more locations in Bangladesh; Mörön and more locations in Mongolia; Dublin Airport; Hamad International Airport; Several libraries around the country include the Tintal library, the Gabriel Garcia Marquez library and the Virgilio Barco library in Bogotá, the José Eustasio Rivera library in Neiva and the San Javier library in Medellín
July	Interior views of Westminster Abbey in London; Sable Island, in Canada; Athens International Airport; San Agustín Archaeological Park, Alto de los Ídolos Archaeological Park & Alto De Las Piedras Archaeological Park; Australia: South Australia Adelaide Botanic Garden, Adelaide Zoo, Australian Capital Territory Bruce Ridge Nature Reserve and New South Wales Georges River near the Sydney Coast.
August	Significantly increased coverage of Indonesia; Fujairah, Dibba Al-Hisn and more locations in the United Arab Emirates; Landmarks in Bolivia including Uyuni train cemetery, El Alto International Airport and 43 others Mexican National Parks including Cañón del Sumidero National Park and the Lagunas de Zempoala National Park; Main cities, tourist sites including Rio de Janeiro and more places around the country Forestry Farm Park and Zoo, Meewasin Trail & South Saskatchewan River
September	Hazeltine National Golf Club; Australia: Namadgi National Park. Ambrym, Vanuatu Animal Kingdom
October	The EmQuartier & Maya Lifestyle Shopping Center
November	Tirana and other major cities in Albania; Podgorica, Nikšić, and other major cities in Montenegro
December	San Juan, Ponce, Mayagüez, Bayamón, Caguas, Guayama and more locations in Puerto Rico; Major cities, tourist sites and more places around in Carambola Beach, Buccaneer Golf Course, Isaac Point, St George Village Botanical Gardens, Rainbow Beach, Hams Bluff, Frederiksted, St Croix, Cruz Bay; Schiermonnikoog National Park

=== 2017 ===
Release date	Major locations added
January	Skydive of Abel Tasman National Park
February	More locations in Greenland; Landmarks in Ghana including Nzulezo Stilt Village plus Accra, Kumasi, Cape Coast, Takoradi, Obuasi, Tamale, Wa and other locations Landmarks in Senegal including Lake Retba, plus Dakar, Thiès, Saint-Louis, Touba and other locations Major National Parks (including Queen Elizabeth, Kibale, Murchison Falls, Mount Elgon and Kidepo Valley) in Uganda; Various coffee plantations in Colombia; Railway stations around Madrid Metropolitan Area; Ramallah, Bethlehem, Jericho and more locations in the West Bank. Cocos Island, Costa Rica.
March	Southeast Volcano Trek in Ambrym, underwater views such as Tongoa Walls, Million Dollar Point and SS President Coolidge wreck in Vanuatu; Main cities and tourist places in the whole overseas region of Papua New Guinea; Main cities and tourist places in the whole overseas region of New Caledonia Tunis, Mahdia and more locations in Tunisia Pembrokeshire Coast Path in Wales; Several tourist sites in the Northeast of Brazil
April	Beaumont-Hamel Newfoundland Memorial, Canadian National Vimy Memorial in Canada; Guatemala City, Mixco, Quetzaltenango, and other cities and locations in Guatemala; Ras al-Khaimah, Dhaid, Manama, Manama, Masafi and more locations in the United Arab Emirates
May	The Crossing from Los Andes in Chile to Mendoza in Argentina
June	Valletta, Birgu, Bormla, Mdina, Qormi, Rabat, Senglea, Siġġiewi, Żabbar, Żebbuġ and more locations in Malta; More locations in South Korea; Boat views of Vistula River in Poland
July	Various neighborhoods in Buenos Aires, Argentina, including Alberti, San Cayetano (La Matanza) and Los Pinos (Escobar). International Space Station; Landmarks in Tunisia; Cotswold Way; Susquehanna Valley Mall; Lagos, Ikeja, Ojo, Lekki, Ikorodu, Epe, Badagry and more locations in Lagos State, Nigeria; Bonete Beach in Ilhabela Island; Austria Burgtheater and other attractions in Austria; Germany Deutsche Oper Berlin, Sanssouci and other attractions in Germany.
August	Valley Mall in Hagerstown; Fairmount Park, Wissahickon Valley Park, Philadelphia Zoo and more parks around Philadelphia
September	Whakaari / White Island, Moutohora Island, Tarawera Falls, Whirinaki Te Pua-a-Tane Conservation Park & Port Ohope Wharf; Jurubatiba Sandbank National Park, Serra dos Órgãos National Park, Serra da Bocaina National Park, Lençóis Maranhenses National Park, Iguaçu National Park & Ilha do Mel State Park
October	Quttinirpaaq National Park, Grise Fiord, Resolute Bay in Canada; Tórshavn, Klaksvík, Hoyvík, Argir, Vágur, Vestmanna, Tvøroyri, Miðvágur, Sørvágur, Toftir, Saltangará, Kollafjørður, Strendur, Sandavágur, Hvalba, Eiði, Sandur, and more locations in the Faroe Islands
November	Royal Natal National Park, Tugela Falls, Otter Trail, iSimangaliso Wetland Park & Mapungubwe National Park
December	Landmarks in Liguria, Italy

=== 2018 ===
Release date	Major locations added
January	Real images of Albuquerque from the state of New Mexico from the series Breaking Bad
February	Some Venues of the 2018 Winter Olympics and Paralympics; Grey Glacier in Torres del Paine National Park, Chile; Jizerská padesátka in Czech Republic; Barcelona Zoo & RCDE Stadium in Spain
March	11 Disney parks in the United States; Mount Pindo; Santa Cruz del Islote
April	Views of beaches and hinterland in Gold Coast, Australia; Various national parks in Canada; Locations in Christmas Island; Locations in Cocos (Keeling) Islands; 150 new images of scenic spots in Taiwan; Emerald Bay State Park, Eagle Falls trailhead, Mount Tallac & Lake Tahoe; Stelvio National Park; Amman, Jerash, Madaba, Kerak, Wadi Musa, Aqaba in Jordan
May	100 km of the Waterfront Trail in Canada; Several train stations in Tokyo among them include Akasaka, Akasaka-Mitsuke, Asakusa, Ueno, Gaienmae, Kōjimachi, Shimbashi, Tatsumi, Tameike-Sannō, Toranomon, Nishi-Shinjuku & Roppongi; Universidad Iberoamericana
June	Several places in the Guadarrama Mountains
July	Vienna, Graz, Linz, Wiener Neustadt, Eisenstadt, Baden bei Wien, Innsbruck, Salzburg in Austria; Historic center of Minsk; Cocos Island, Playa Hermosa, Playa Matapalo, Centro Costarricense de Ciencia y Cultura, Parroquia Nuestra Señora de la Limpia Concepción del Rescate de Ujarrás Ruinas de Cartago and more tourist sites in Costa Rica; Tourist sites in Nigeria such as the Lekki Conservation Centre, the Millennium Park and the Olumo Rock
August	Cygnus offshore gas platform in North Sea; Some venues of the 2018 Asian Games
September	Landmarks in Lebanon including Jeita Grotto, National Museum of Beirut and Al Shouf Cedar Nature Reserve; Views of Lake Toba, Borobudur, and Gelora Sriwijaya Stadium; International Hot Air Balloon Festival at Leon Metropolitan Park; Mount Ōmuro, Jogasaki Coast, Mount Komuroyama & Shiofuki Park
October	The Danube Delta including Sulina branch, Sfântu Gheorghe branch, Sulina, Sfântu Gheorghe, Tulcea, Chilia Veche, Crișan in Romania; Nairobi, Mombasa, Nakuru, Eldoret, Nyeri and more locations in Kenya
November	Kalka–Shimla railway, Nilgiri Mountain Railway and several railway stations in India; 14 shopping centers in Argentina
December	Willemstad, Barber, Brievengat, Santa Catarina, Santa Rosa, Sint Willibrordus, Soto in Curaçao

=== 2019 ===
Release date	Major locations added
January	Boat views along the Shannon River in Ireland.
February	Santo Domingo & Santiago de los Caballeros in the Dominican Republic. State Trails in Minnesota, United States.
March	Boat views along the whole course of Waikato River in New Zealand; Locations on Devon Island, Canada. Urban Archaeological Park of Brancaleone Vetus in Italy.
April	Ipswich Nature Centre, Woodlands of Marburg, Purga Nature Reserve, Ivory's Rock, White Rock Conservation Park, Robelle Domain and Flinders Peak Conservation Park in Australia.
May	La Moneda presidential palace in Chile; Several trails around the Fløyen Mountain, Norway.
June	Moravia Commune in Medellín, Columbia. Google Trekker views of Villa Inflammable, Villa La Carbonilla and Rodrigo Bueno neighborhoods in Buenos Aires & updates in Argentina
July	Abuja, Enugu, Ibadan, Benin City and more roads in Nigeria; Tourist sites in Bogotá Park Way, Sendero de Monserrate, Chorro de Quevedo y calle del Embudo, Parque Santander, Parque de la Independencia, Sendero Ecológico San Francisco, Cerro de Guadalupe, Humedal Santa María del Lago, Parque El Virrey, Usme – Agroparque los Soches, Sendero Las Moyas, Cabildo Indígena Muisca de Bosa, Cerro Gordo, Cementerio Central, Estadio Nemesio Camacho El Campín, Páramo El Verjón, Humedal Córdoba, Museo El Chicó, Humedal La Conejera, Mirador de Los Nevados, Parque Ecológico Soratama, Parque de la 93, Parque el Virrey, including Parque Mirador de los Nevados, Quebrada Las Delicias and the San Francisco - Vicachá trail in Colombia
August	Tombolo Land Bridge, Dogashima Hiking Trail, Norihama Beach, Karuno Park, Anjo Cape, Ajyou Misaki Park, Koganezaki Park, Odase Tenmangu Shinto Shrine, trails around Imayama Mountain, Umagase Scenic viewpoint and more locations in Japan
September	Fringing Coral Reef in Australia
October	City Centre Deira
November	Torretes Biological Station and Botanical Garden, Font Roja Scientific Station, La Alcudia Archaeological Site, Santa Pola Marine Research Center and several trails around mountains in Alicante such as Sierra del Oltá; Granite Mountain Hotshots Memorial State Park; Yobake Scenic viewpoint, Shirasuna Park, Shirakawa Bridge in Chichibu Geo Gravity Park, Chichibu Fudasho No. 4 Kinshoji Temple and more locations in Japan
December	21 National Parks including Chyulu Hills National Park, Lake Nakuru National Park, Shimba Hills National Reserve, Aberdare National Park, Ruma National Park & Meru National Park; National parks in Tasmania, Australia; Several parks and trails in Arizona among them include Picacho Peak State Park, Catalina State Park, Dead Horse Ranch State Park, Patagonia Lake State Park, Sonoita Creek State Natural Area, Red Rock State Park & Lost Dutchman State Park

=== 2020 ===
Release date	Major locations added
January	Seguros in Zürich, Switzerland
February	Mountain Chalets in Tatra, Slovakia; Tama Central Park, Tsurumaki Higashi Park & Takarano Park in Tama "Hawker Centers" (malls focused on food sales) that group more than 6,000 stores in Singapore
March	Honda Collection Hall, Mazda Museum, Toyota Automobile Museum; Museo Ferrari, Museo Lamborghini, Pagani Automobili S.p.A. McLaren Technology Centre; National Corvette Museum; Porsche Museum; Volvo Museum; Škoda Auto Museum
April	Northumberland National Park including Cheviot Hills, Sycamore Gap
May	Scaletta Mountain, Chersogno Mountain and more than 200 km of trails in the Maira Valley; Views by boat of the Royal Canal
June	Klagenfurt, Villach, Wels, Sankt Pölten, Dornbirn, Steyr, Feldkirch, Bregenz, Wolfsberg, Leoben, Krems an der Donau and more locations in Austria; The Ningaloo Coast; Orta Lake; Gwynedd Coast in Wales
July	Valle delle Ferriere State Reserve in Italy.
October	Onkaparinga River National Park in South Australia.
November	Brickworks Centre, Casula Mall, Dapto Shopping Centre, Gasworks Plaza, Macquarie Shopping Centre, Malvern Central, Marketown Shopping Centre, Marrickville Metro Shopping Centre, Northbridge Plaza, Ocean Keys Shopping Centre, Pacific Fair Shopping Centre, Royal Randwick Shopping Centre & Stud Park Shopping Centre; Bayfair Shopping Centre, Botany Town Centre, Centre City Shopping Centre, Merivale Mall & The Palms Shopping Centre; Main cities and tourist places in the whole overseas region of Guadeloupe
December	Ho Chi Minh City, Hanoi, Part of Hải Phòng, Part of Hạ Long, Part of Móng Cái, Part of Yên Bái, Huế, Part of Đà Nẵng, Part of Sông Cầu and eight other cities in Vietnam. China: Beijing, Ullens Center for Contemporary Art, Forbidden City There also are some selected attractions and museums in Beijing (Forbidden City), in Wuhan, Yangzhou, Hangzhou and Suzhou. National and University Library of Slovenia Beekeeping Museum in Radovljica and Posavje Museum Brežice

=== 2021 ===
Release date	Major locations added
March	Chao Phraya River in Thailand.
April	Brazil: São Paulo Metro; Nigeria: African Artists' Foundation, Rele Art Gallery and Terra Kulture
May	143 train stations in Sydney
June	More locations and updated images in the United States of America; Australia Gayndah, more places and updated pictures in Australia; Updated pictures in Belgium; Additional locations and updated images in São Paulo and Rio de Janeiro; Bulgaria Updated images in Stara Zagora and Yambol counties Updated images in the United Kingdom; Updated images in Ontario and British Columbia; Updated pictures in Denmark; More places and updated pictures in Ecuador; Walking streets in Helsinki and updated pictures in Finland; France More places and updated pictures in France; Updated pictures in the Netherlands; Tuen Mun to Chek Lap Kok connection and updated images in Hong Kong; Manado-Bitung Highway, Palembang-Lampung Highway, more locations and updated images in Java, Sulawesi and Riau; Nuka Island and updated pictures in Japan; Liechtenstein Streets in Balzers; Updated pictures in Budapest and Csongrád-Csanád County; More places and updated pictures in Malaysia; Updated pictures in Mexico City; Updated images on the A61 motorway Updated pictures in Italy; Updated images in Portugal; Romania Walking streets in Buzău; Updated pictures in Ceuta and Seville; Roads in Grimentz, Saas-Almagell, Saas-Grund, Saas-Balen, Eisten, Bedretto, Realp, Gadmen and Innertkirchen, updated pictures in Switzerland; More locations in southern Sweden, Karlstad, around Gothenburg and Umeå, Vännäs and Arvidsjaur, updated images in the big cities, Gotland and Öland; Updated pictures of Singapore; Updated images in Taiwan; Updated pictures of Thailand; New Zealand More locations and updated images of the North Island.
July	New South Wales National Parks including Kosciuszko National Park in Australia. Oxford Botanic Gardens in United Kingdom; Labirinto della Masone in Italy
August	Main cities and tourist places in the whole overseas region of Martinique. (Unofficial coverage)
September	Main cities and tourist places in the whole overseas region of Saint Pierre and Miquelon (Unofficial coverage)
November	The route of the Vía Verde del Plazaola, which joins Andoain with the Navarran town of Sarasa. Boat views along the Ottawa River
December	White House; Using technology similar to Google Street View, virtual tours allow people to walk through museums as if they were just another visitor in Brazil.

=== 2022 ===
Release date	Major locations added
January	Updates in Belgium; Erasmus House in Jakarta, Indonesia
March	The first 15 Sites and Memory Space in Argentina; Bangladesh, covering mostly agricultural areas of Dhaka Division, images taken starting in November 2021.
May	Les Invalides; Milan Cathedral; Great Mosque of Djenné in Mali; Some views of ferries in Sydney using a Trekker; 23 historical and cultural sites in Italy captured with a tripod in association with Unione Nazionale Pro Loco d'Italia di Ragusa: Comiso Natural History Museum, Salvatore Quasimodo Communal Library, House where Salvatore Quasimodo was born in Modica, Franco Libero Belgiorno Civic Museum
June	Carakana Arts Gallery in Nairobi, Kenya
July	Some trekkers in Tierra del Fuego, southern Argentina; New Delhi, Delhi, Ghaziabad, Noida, Faridabad, Mumbai, Thane, Navi Mumbai, Bhiwandi, Kalyan, Virar, Chennai, Vadodara, Ahmedabad, Pune, Sholapur, Surat, Nashik, Pimpri Chinchwad, Ahmednagar, Lucknow, Kanpur, Allahabad, Varanasi, Gorakhpur, Nagpur, Hyderabad, Miyapur, Bengaluru, Chandrapur, Meerut, Sonipat, Amritsar, Jalandhar, Chandigarh, Panchkula, Dehradun, Ludhiana, Haridwar, Nadiad, Anand, Nanded, Visakhapatnam in India
August	Ajmer, Bharuch, Gandhinagar, Jaipur, Kakinada, Srikakulam, Roorkee, Rishikesh, Udaipur, Vijayawada in India; Zagreb, Pula, Split, Zadar, Dubrovnik, Rijeka, Šibenik, Karlovac, Krk, Bjelovar, Slavonski Brod, Đakovo, Virovitica, other locations and updates in Croatia; Bangkok Art and Culture Centre in Thailand
September	Some parts of Goa such as Margao, in addition to other parts in the country such as Jodhpur, Aligarh, Patiala, Batala and Bathinda in India; Phansi Museum in Durban, KwaZulu-Natal
October	Bondo and Wajir in Kenya; Jos, Port Harcourt, Kano, Zaria, Kaduna, Minna, Ilorin, Ogbomosho, Osogbo, Warri, Owerri, Uyo, Calabar, Enugo, Makurdi, Lafia and more places in Nigeria; Rwanda Google released official coverage in the capital Kigali, and this adds a new country to Google Street View. Google used a generation four camera to capture this footage with. Parts of Bhubaneshwar, Cuttack, Rajahmundry, Hoshiarpur, Machilipatnam, Nellore, Ongole, Anantapur, Nandyal, Silvassa, Navsari, Vasco da Gama, Goa, Mathura, Daman, and continued additions in many areas of India. Ilédì Oǹtótóo & Susanne Wenger House Osogbo, Osun State, Nigeria
November	Part of Doha and Al Khor in Qatar; Some installations of the 23rd Biennale of Sydney with coverage at Walsh Bay and Barrangaroo Reserve; Google Arts Coverage in Shenzhen, Guangdong Province: Nashan Museum, Wangye Museum, Tian Hou Temple, Dongguan Assembly Hall, Archway of Nantou Ancient City, Xin'an County Office; Hugh Masekela Memorial Pavilion in Johannesburg, Gauteng Province and Arch for Arch in Cape Town, Western Cape Province
December	Some historical sites located in the Murad Khane District in Kabul; Belagavi and Hubballi in Karnataka

=== 2023 ===
Release date	Major locations added
January	Kolkata and other places in West Bengal; Tripods in Portugal, in collaboration with the Portuguese Navy, including Frigate Dom Fernando II e Glória, Vasco da Gama Aquarium, Calouste Gulbenkian Planetarium
February	McLaren Technology Centre in Woking; View from trekker and tripod from various museums, memorials and historical sites around South Korea, including Provisional Capital Memorial Hall, War Memorial of Korea, National Institute of Ecology
March	Marine Heritage Gallery (Jakarta) in collaboration with the Ministry of Marine Affairs and Fisheries of Indonesia; Museum Tripods for Google Arts and Culture in Lesser Poland Voivodeship including Żupny Castle, Szołayski House National Museum, Zbaraski Palace
April	Daegu Concert House in Daegu; Ca' Granda at University of Milan
May	Patna and other places in Bihar
June	Agartala in Tripura; Bongaigaon, Guwahati, Lumding, Silchar in Assam; Shillong in Meghalaya; Tripods in San Antonio, Texas including Casa Navarro, Ruby City, Briscoe Western Art Museum, Witte Museum; Aizawl and other places in Mizoram
July	Berlin, Bielefeld, Bochum, Bonn, Bremen, Dortmund, Dresden, Duisburg, Düsseldorf, Essen, Frankfurt, Hamburg, Hanover, Cologne, Leipzig, Mannheim, Munich, Nuremberg, Stuttgart, Wuppertal coverage released all throughout Germany, covering most major cities, towns, villages, major and rural roads Dharmanagar, Udaipur in Tripura; Itanagar in Arunachal Pradesh; Shimla in Himachal Pradesh
September	Qatar in Al Khor, Al Bayt Stadium, Lusail, Al Rayyan, Ahmad bin Ali Stadium, Education City Stadium, Khalifa International Stadium, Doha, Al Thumama Stadium, Stadium 974, Al Wakrah, Al Janoub Stadium, Qatar University, Aspire Academy, Al Arabi SC Stadium, Banyan Tree, Al Sailiya SC Stadium, Al Ahli SC Stadium, Al Wakrah SC Stadium, Al Sadd SC Stadium, Al Shamal SC Stadium, Aspire Zone, Al Duhail SC Stadium, Duhail Handball Sports Hall, Le Méridien and The Pearl. Panama in Bocas del Toro, Chiriquí, Coclé, Colón, Darién, Herrera, Los Santos, Panamá, West Panamá, Veraguas, Emberá, Guna Yala, Naso Tjër Di, Ngäbe-Buglé, Kuna de Madugandí and Kuna de Wargandí. Unamuno House Museum in Salamanca University in Spain
October	Updated images of Los Angeles, San Diego, Yuma, Phoenix AZ, San Luis Obispo, San Jose, San Francisco, Sacramento CA, Eugene, Salem, Portland OR, Olympia, Seattle WA, Boise, Pocatello Cheyenne, Denver CO, Colorado Springs CO, Kearney, St. Joseph, Kansas City, Topeka KA, Wichita KS, Oklahoma City OK, Dallas TX, Fort Worth TX, Baton Rouge LA, New Orleans, Jackson, Little Rock AR, Memphis, St. Louis, Iowa City, Cedar Rapids, Minneapolis, Saint Paul MN, Milwaukee WI, Chicago IL, Indianapolis, Louisville KY, Cincinnati, Columbus OH, Detroit, Cleveland, Erie, Buffalo NY, Niagara Falls, Rochester NY, Albany NY, Bennington, Nashua, Boston MA, Providence RI, New Haven, New York City, Trenton, Philadelphia, Baltimore, Washington, D.C., Richmond VA, Raleigh NC, Winston-Salem NC, Charlotte NC, Knoxville TN, Nashville TN, Birmingham AL, Montgomery, Tallahassee, Gainesville, Tampa FL, Sarasota, Jacksonville FL, Miami FL, Fort Lauderdale FL, West Palm Beach FL, Orlando FL, Daytona Beach, Augusta, Savannah GA, Macon, Athens, Rome, Atlanta and the former Centennial Olympic Stadium site in the United States; Updated images of Milan, Rome, Naples, Bari, Florence, Turin, Verona, Bologna, Genoa and Cagliari in Italy Updated images of Innsbruck, Klagenfurt, Salzburg and Vienna in Austria
November	Rwanda: Butare, Kibeho, Nyungwe Forest National Park, Akagera National Park, Volcanoes National Park and updates in Kigali

=== 2024 ===
Release date	Major locations added
February	Ruhengeri, Muhanga, Kabarondo and Kigarama in Rwanda; Rote Island in Indonesia
March	Semey, Kokshetau, Aktobe, Almaty, Konaev, Astana, Atyrau, Oskemen, Taraz, Taldykorgan, Karaganda, Kostanay, Kyzylorda, Aktau, Petropavl, Pavlodar, Shymkent, Turkistan, Jezkazgan, Uralsk, most major roads, and a few minor roads in Kazakhstan. Major cities and smaller towns in São Tomé and Príncipe. Official tripod coverage in collaboration with Historic Royal Palaces in London, England: Tower of London and Church of St Peter ad Vincula
April	National Library of the Czech Republic in Prague; Beirut, Zahlé, Tripoli, Sidon, among other places in Lebanon
May	Legnica Copper Museum, Church of Peace in Jawor, Museum of Papermaking in Duszniki-Zdrój in Poland; King Island in Australia
July	Leang Karampuang in South Sulawesi, Indonesia
August	Andaman and Nicobar Islands in India; Vichada Department in Colombia; Flinders Island in Australia
September	Catedral de Mallorca and Museu Diocesà in Palma de Mallorca, Spain
October	Vaduz, Schaan and other cities in Liechtenstein; Muscat, Sohar, Salalah, Duqm, Sur, Nizwa, Ibri, Rustaq, Al-Buraimi, Haima, Ibra, Khasab and other cities in Oman
November	Lakshadweep in India; Royal Institute of British Architects in London, England. National Gallery of Art in Washington, D.C., United States
December	London Underground in London, England

=== 2025 ===
Release date	Major locations added
April	Short sections of the A6 motorway and various smaller roads in the westernmost areas near Avdimou, in Akrotiri and Dhekelia
May	Nubuke Foundation in Accra, Ghana; Jardín Escultórico Edward James (Las Pozas), Xilitla, San Luis Potosi in Mexico
June	Windhoek, Walvis Bay, Swakopmund, Grootfontein, Henties Bay, Karasburg, Keetmanshoop, Mariental, Otjiwarongo and other towns in Namibia. Liang Maarewu in Muna Island, South-East Sulawesi and Liang Biraeng, South Sulawesi, Indonesia; Expanded coverage of Puerto Rico; Major cities and smaller towns in Vietnam
August	Major cities and smaller towns in Nepal; Major cities and smaller towns in Costa Rica
October	Remote locations in Oman
November	Major cities and towns in Cyprus; Major cities and towns in Bosnia and Herzegovina; Major cities and towns in Paraguay

=== 2026 ===
Release date	Major locations added
June	Major cities and towns in Georgia
July	Major cities and towns in Kosovo; Expanded coverage of Serbia, North Macedonia, Albania and Montenegro

== Official coverage by country οr territory ==
Below is a table showing the countries available on Street View and the year they were first added. Plain text indicates that a country has only views of certain businesses and/or tourist attractions.

=== Current coverage ===
Bold with an asterisk (*) indicates countries with public street view available

Country or territory	Continent	Notes
Afghanistan	Asia	Only a few buildings around Kabul are available
Akrotiri and Dhekelia*	Asia	Short sections of the A6 motorway and various smaller roads in the westernmost areas near Avdimou, possibly mistakenly released
Åland Islands*	Europe	Autonomous region of Finland.
Albania*	Europe	
American Samoa*	Oceania	
Andorra*	Europe	
Antarctica	Antarctica	
Argentina*	South America	
Australia*	Oceania	Added on the same day as Japan. On August 4, 2008, 28 icons of major metropolitan areas were added.
Austria*	Europe	
Bangladesh*	Asia	
Belarus*	Europe	Historical center of Minsk only.
Belgium*	Europe	
Bermuda*	North America	
Bhutan*	Asia	First South Asian country available.
Bolivia*	South America	
Bosnia and Herzegovina*	Europe	
Botswana*	Africa	
Brazil*	South America	First country available in South America.
British Indian Ocean Territory	Asia	Views of Peros Banhos and many other islands.
Bulgaria*	Europe	
Cambodia*	Asia	
Canada*	North America	
Chile*	South America	
China	Asia	Only tourist places such as museums have received coverage as of November 2020.
Christmas Island*	Asia	
Cocos (Keeling) Islands*	Asia	
Colombia*	South America	
Costa Rica*	Central America	
Croatia*	Europe	In 2022, Google returned to capture street view images in Croatia after an 11-year hiatus.
Curaçao*	North America	
Cyprus*	Asia	
Czech Republic*	Europe	
Denmark*	Europe	
Dominican Republic*	North America	Only around Santo Domingo and Santiago de los Caballeros.
Ecuador*	South America	
Egypt	Asia & Africa	A few touristic landmarks such as the Giza necropolis.
Estonia*	Europe	
Eswatini*	Africa	
Falkland Islands	South America	New Island, West Point Island and Carcass Island only.
Faroe Islands*	Europe	
Finland*	Europe	
France*	Europe	Added on the same day as Italy, one of the first two countries available in Europe. Providing the first service outside the United States and the debut of Google's new 2nd Generation Cameras.
Georgia*	Asia & Europe	
Germany*	Europe	20 biggest cities in addition to some touristic landmarks. In July 2023 Google updated the existing coverage and added new locations.
Ghana*	Africa	
Gibraltar*	Europe	
Greece*	Europe	
Greenland*	North America	
Guam*	Oceania	
Guatemala*	Central America	
Hong Kong*	Asia	First place with Street View in mainland Asia, along with Macau.
Hungary*	Europe	
Iceland*	Europe	
India*	Asia	All major cities across India as well as some rural areas, plans to cover the rest of India.
Indonesia*	Asia	Unavailable in most of Aceh and all of West Papua.
Iraq	Asia	National Museum of Iraq only.
Ireland*	Europe	
Isle of Man*	Europe	
Israel*	Asia	First West Asian country available, along with Palestine.
Italy*	Europe	Added on the same day as France, one of the first two countries available in Europe.
Japan*	Asia	First country available in Asia, added on the same day as Australia. Also one of the first two island countries with Street View.
Jersey*	Europe	
Jordan*	Asia	43 archaeological locations covered, public Street View available since April 2018.
Kazakhstan*	Asia	Covers most major cities and major roads.
Kenya*	Africa	Public Street View available since October 2018.
Kosovo*	Europe	
Kyrgyzstan*	Asia	First Central Asian country available.
Laos*	Asia	Vientiane only until May 2016 when Luang Prabang, Vang Vieng, Pakse and Savannakhet were added.
Latvia*	Europe	
Lebanon*	Asia	Landmarks views since 2018.
Lesotho*	Africa	
Liechtenstein*	Europe	
Lithuania*	Europe	
Luxembourg*	Europe	Complete update of Luxembourg's road network underway 2022
Mali	Africa	Various historical sites.
Macau*	Asia	First place with Street View in mainland Asia, along with Hong Kong.
Madagascar	Africa	Select cities and landmarks in 2014.
Malaysia*	Asia	Landmarks only until September 2014.
Malta*	Europe	
Martinique	North America	First available territory in the Caribbean, only a few touristic landmarks.
Mexico*	North America	First Latin American country to be added to Google Street View.
Monaco*	Europe	
Mongolia*	Asia	
Montenegro*	Europe	
Namibia*	Africa	
Nepal*	Asia	
Netherlands*	Europe	
New Zealand*	Oceania	
Nigeria*	Africa	
North Macedonia*	Europe	
Northern Mariana Islands*	Oceania	
Norway*	Europe	
Oman*	Asia	
Pakistan	Asia	Landmarks only.
Palestine*	Asia	First West Asian place available, along with Israel. West Bank coverage only, which also includes those of Israeli settlements.
Panama*	Central America	
Paraguay	South America	
Peru*	South America	
Philippines*	Asia	
Pitcairn Islands*	Oceania	
Poland*	Europe	
Portugal*	Europe	
Puerto Rico*	North America	First Caribbean state available.
Qatar*	Asia	Museum and airport views, including a view inside of planes. Since September 2023, more images of places in Qatar began to be shown.
Réunion*	Africa	
Romania*	Europe	First Southeast European country available.
Russia*	Europe & Asia	Museum view only until 2012.
Rwanda*	Africa	First country with 4th generation coverage only. The fastest country to receive its first coverage after starting to collect the Street View data (2 months).
San Marino*	Europe	
São Tomé and Príncipe*	Africa	
Senegal*	Africa	First West African country available.
Serbia*	Europe	
Singapore*	Asia	First Southeast Asian country available.
Slovakia*	Europe	
Slovenia*	Europe	
South Africa*	Africa	First country available in Africa.
South Korea*	Asia	
South Georgia and the South Sandwich Islands	South America & Antarctica	
Spain*	Europe	
Sri Lanka*	Asia	
St. Pierre and Miquelon	North America	
Svalbard and Jan Mayen*	Europe	Views of Longyearbyen, Pyramiden, Barentsburg along with boat views.
Sweden*	Europe	
Switzerland*	Europe	First Central European country available and first landlocked country with Street View.
Taiwan*	Asia	
Tanzania	Africa	Few landmarks such as Mount Kilimanjaro and the Gombe National Park.
Thailand*	Asia	
Tunisia*	Africa	First North African country available.
Turkey*	Europe & Asia	
Uganda*	Africa	First East African country available.
Ukraine*	Europe	
United Arab Emirates*	Asia	Landmarks available since 2013, Dubai only until September 2015.
United Kingdom*	Europe	First North European country available.
United States*	North America	First country available to view on Street View.
United States Minor Outlying Islands	Oceania	Midway Atoll and other atolls.
United States Virgin Islands*	North America	
Uruguay*	South America	
Vanuatu	Oceania	Views of the Ambrym island and its volcano.
Vietnam*	Asia	

=== Future coverage ===
The following countries are slated to receive official Google Street View coverage based on announcements from Google, governmental agencies or national newspapers:

- Kuwait

== Unofficial coverage ==
- Antarctica Part of King George Island
- El Salvador Main cities and along the main highways connecting the main cities.
- Martinique Main cities and tourist places in the whole overseas region of Martinique
- Saint Pierre and Miquelon Main cities and tourist places in the whole overseas region of Saint Pierre and Miquelon
- Spain Ghost towns in some parts of Spain including Tobes, El Alamín, Oreja, Boñices and Matandrino
- Tonga Main cities and tourist places in the whole overseas region of Tonga in Grid Pacific
- Zimbabwe Views of some highways and the central business districts of Harare, Chegutu, Rusape, Masvingo and two United Nations World Heritage Sites: Great Zimbabwe National Monument and Victoria Falls. The first instances of Google Street View in Zimbabwe were contributed by photographer Tawanda Kanhema
- Barbados Main cities and tourist places in the whole overseas region of Barbados in Caribbean Development Bank.
- Armenia Main cities and tourists places in the whole region of Armenia in Armenia 360.
- Bahamas Most roads, cities and tourists places in the whole region of the Bahamas.
- Turks & Caicos Islands Main cities, tourists places and along the main roads in the whole overseas region of the Turks & Caicos Islands.
