= Roni da Silva =

Brazilian-born Portuguese footballer

Personal information
- Full name: Roniere Jose da Silva Filho
- Date of birth: 23 April 1986 (age 40)
- Place of birth: Cansanção, Brazil
- Height: 1.80 m (5 ft 11 in)
- Position: Forward

Team information
- Current team: Al-Shabab
- Number: 15

Senior career*
Years	Team	Apps	(Gls)
2005	Varginha	?	(?)
2006	Mogi Mirim	?	(?)
2007	Batatais	?	(?)
2008	Atibaia	?	(?)
2009	Grêmio	?	(?)
2010	Primeira Camisa	?	(?)
2010	Mamoré	?	(?)
2011	Inter de Limeira	18	(4)
2012–2013	Ulsan Dolphin	17	(4)
2014	Goyang Hi	21	(2)
2015	Penapolense	3	(0)
2016–	Al-Shabab	2	(0)
- * Club domestic league appearances and goals

Roniere Jose da Silva Filho (born 23 April 1986) commonly known as Roni da Silva is a Portuguese professional footballer who plays for Goyang Hi in K League Challenge as a forward.

== Club career ==
Roniere kicked off his career with Vardinha in 2005 and played for several other Brazilian clubs in the lower divisions till 2011, when he joined Korean third-tier club Ulsan Dolphin. In 2014, he entered professional football on the courtesy of signing for Goyang Hi of K League Challenge. He scored his first goal for the club against Chungju Hummel.
