= Tawanda =

Tawanda is a Zimbabwean masculine given name that may refer to the following notable people:

- Tawanda Chirewa (born 2003), English football midfielder
- Tawanda Chiwira (born 1974), Zimbabwean sprinter
- Tawanda Kanhema (born 1980 or 1981), Zimbabwean photographer
- Tawanda Manyimo (born 1981), Zimbabwean-born New Zealand actor
- Tawanda Muparati (born 1983), Zimbabwean football defender
- Tawanda Mupariwa (born 1985), Zimbabwean cricketer
- Tawanda Maswanhise (born 2002), Zimbabwean football player
- Tawanda Mutasah (born 1970), Zimbabwean lawyer and human rights advocate
- Tawanda Muyeye (born 2001), Zimbabwean-born cricketer
