= Modelo, Santa Catarina =

Modelo
- Flag Coat of arms

- Location of Modelo

- Location within Brazil
- Coordinates: 28°46′42″S 53°03′19″W
- Country: Brazil
- Region: South
- State: (Santa Catarina (state)) Santa Catarina
- Founded: December 7, 1961

Government
  - Mayor: Bárbara Milena Geller Baron (MDB)

Area
  - Total: 93 km^{2} (36 sq mi)
- Elevation: 470 m (1,540 ft)

Population (2020)
  - Total: 4,218
  - Density: 40.6/km^{2} (105/sq mi)
- Time zone: UTC-3 (UTC-3)
  - Summer (DST): UTC-2 (UTC-2)
- Website: www.modelo.sc.gov.br

Modelo is a city in Santa Catarina, in the Southern Region of Brazil. The area was granted municipality status in 1961, its area being taken from the existing municipality of São Carlos; Three areas have subsequently been removed to form the new municipalities of Bom Jesus do Oeste, Serra Alta and Sul Brasil.
