= Chofu Aerospace Center =

Development facility of JAXA

Coordinates: 35.6787°N 139.5587°E

- 調布航空宇宙センター

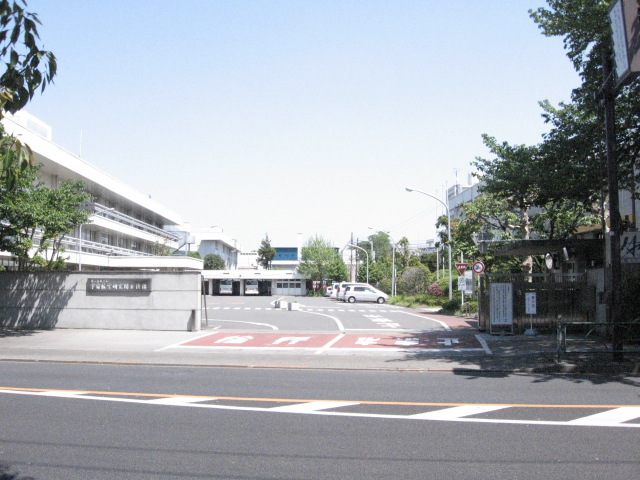
- JAXA Head Office

Agency overview
- Formed: 1962
- Jurisdiction: Japanese government
- Headquarters: Chōfu, Tokyo, Japan
- Parent agency: JAXA

Chōfu Aerospace Center (調布航空宇宙センター, Chōfu Kōkū-uchū senta) is the headquarters and main development facility for the Japan Aerospace Exploration Agency (JAXA).

The Chōfu Aerospace Center concentrates on aerospace engineering research and development, and is equipped with test facilities including several wind tunnels, materials test facilities, flight simulators, engine test stands and a supercomputer.
