= Águas de Chapecó =

Coordinates: 27°05′S 52°59′W

- Municipality
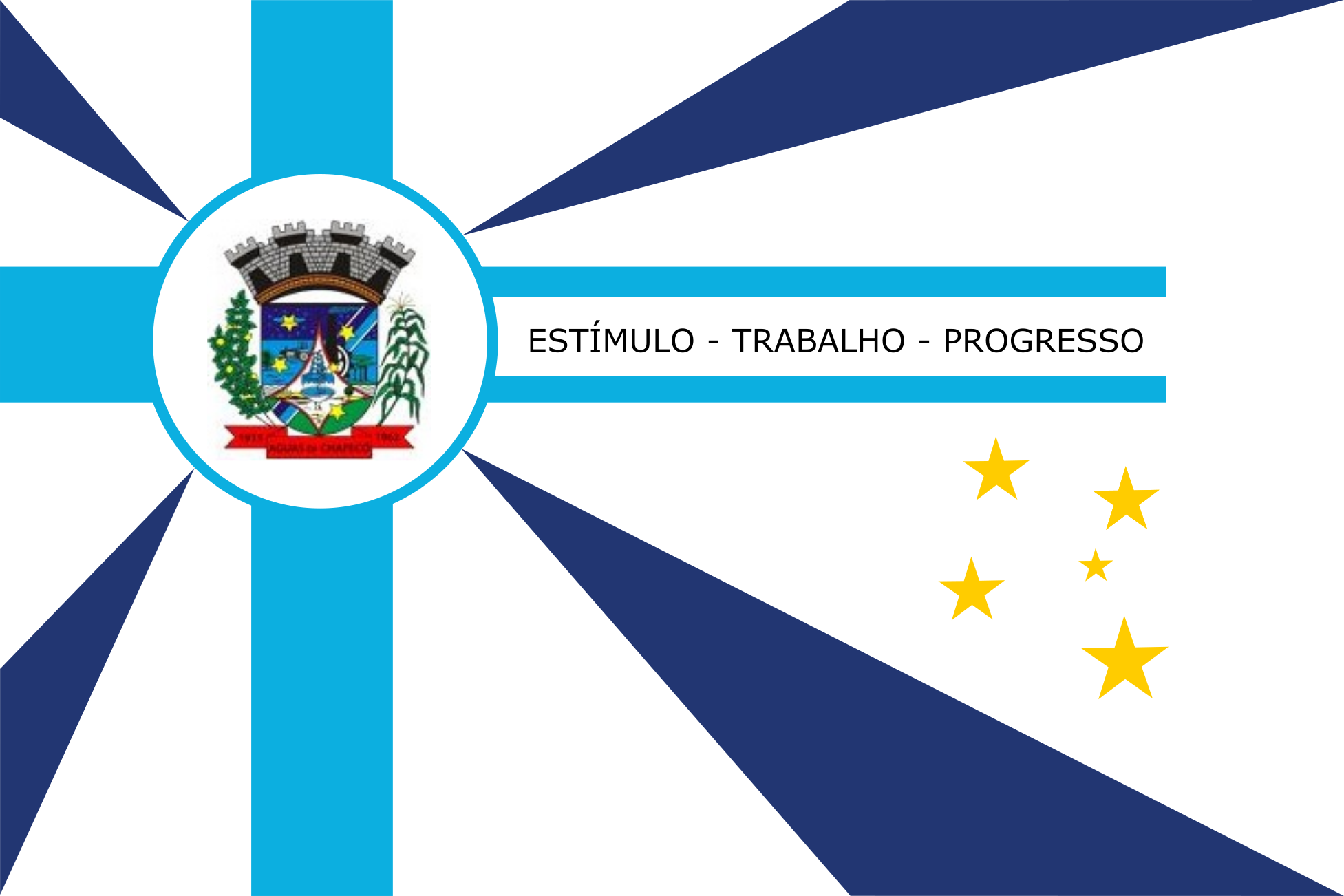
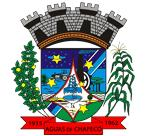
- Flag Coat of arms
- Interactive map of Águas de Chapecó
- Country: Brazil
- Region: South
- State: Santa Catarina
- Mesoregion: Oeste Catarinense

Population (2020)
  - Total: 6,515
- Time zone: UTC−3 (BRT)

Águas de Chapecó is a municipality in the state of Santa Catarina in the South region of Brazil.

== See also ==
- List of municipalities in Santa Catarina
