= Vila Nova dos Martírios =

Coordinates: 5.18778°S 48.1358°W

- Municipality
- Interactive map of Vila Nova dos Martírios
- Country: Brazil
- Region: Nordeste
- State: Maranhão
- Mesoregion: Oeste Maranhense
- Established: September 14, 1988 (27 years)

Government Karla Batista Cabral
  - Type: Mayor

Population (2020)
  - Total: 13,598
- Time zone: UTC−3 (BRT)

Vila Nova dos Martírios is a municipality in the state of Maranhão in the Northeast region of Brazil.

== See also ==
- List of municipalities in Maranhão
