= Guaraní, Misiones =

Coordinates: 27°31′S 55°10′W

Guaraní (Misiones)
- Municipality and village
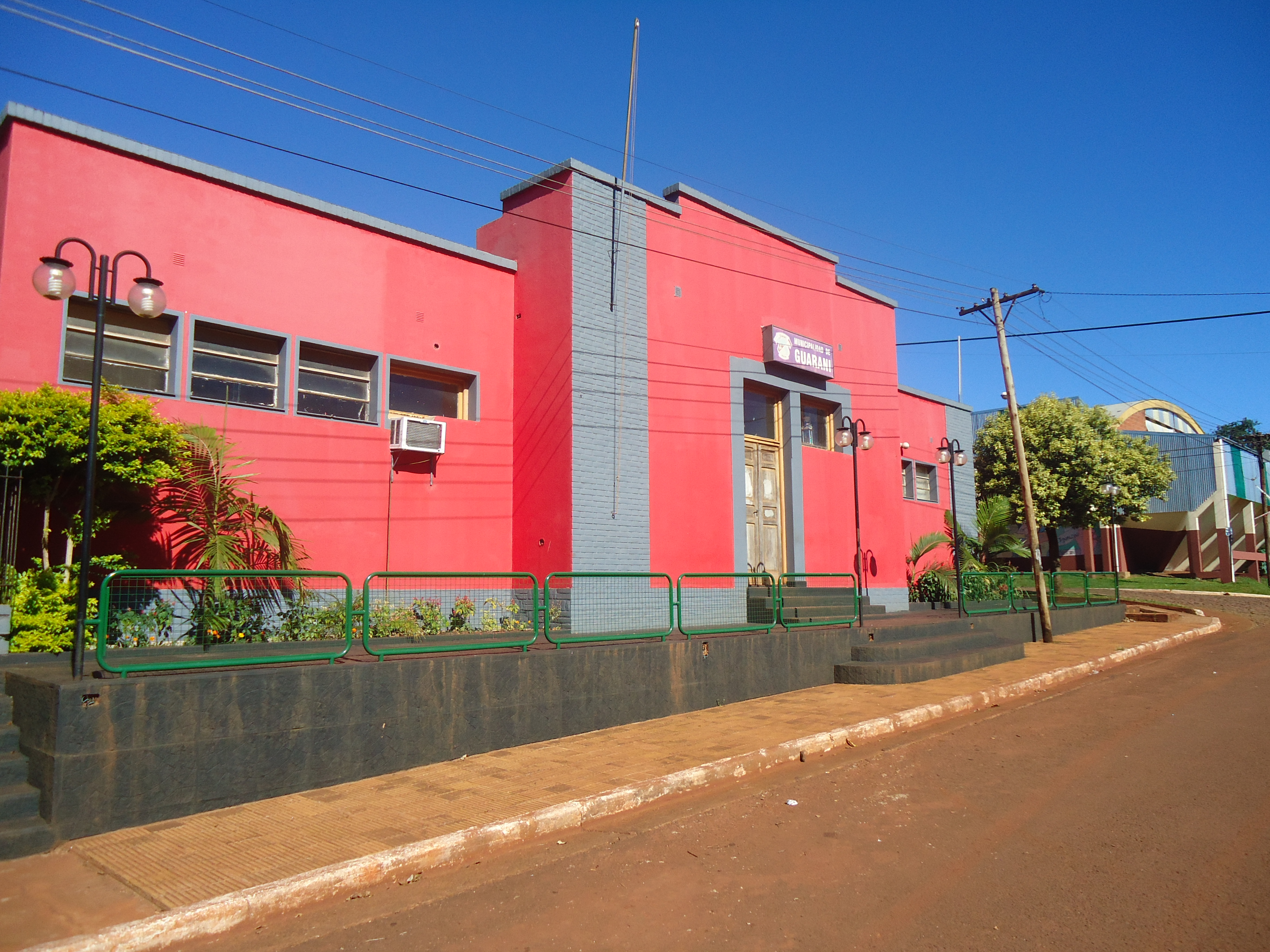
- Interactive map of Guaraní (Misiones)
- Country: Argentina
- Province: Misiones Province
- Time zone: UTC−3 (ART)

Guaraní (Misiones) is a village and municipality in Misiones Province in north-eastern Argentina.
