= Reriutaba =

Municipality in Ceará, Brazil

Coordinates: 4°10′S 40°35′W

- Municipality
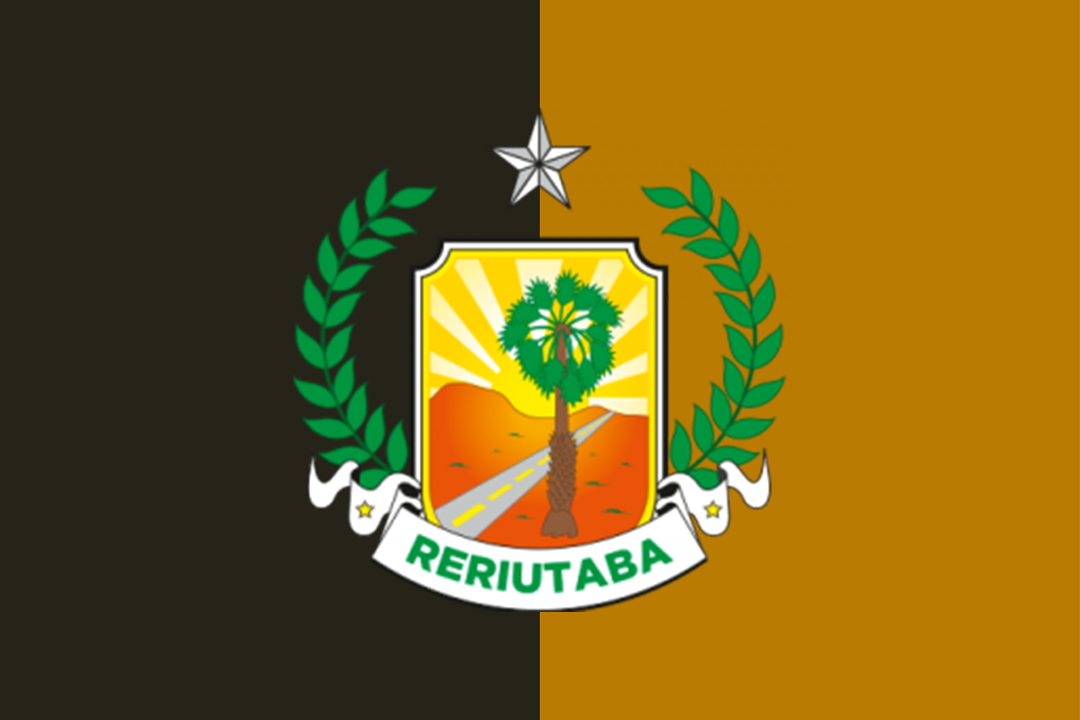
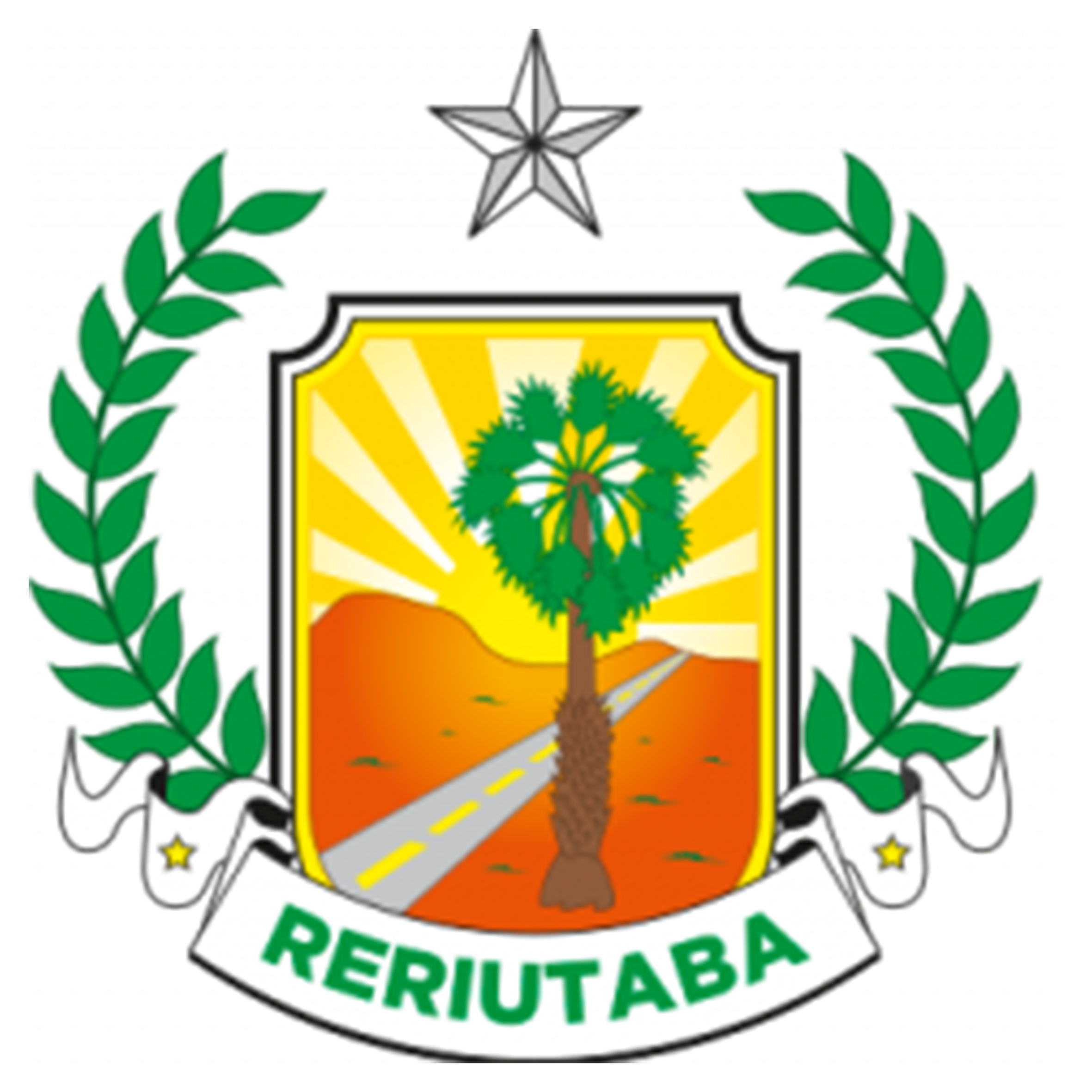
- Flag Coat of arms
- Interactive map of Reriutaba
- Country: Brazil
- Region: Nordeste
- State: Ceará
- Mesoregion: Noroeste Cearense

Population (2020)
  - Total: 18,385
- Time zone: UTC−3 (BRT)

Reriutaba is a municipality in the state of Ceará in the Northeast region of Brazil.

Reriutaba is mentioned in Central do Brasil, a movie directed by Walter Salles.

== See also ==
- List of municipalities in Ceará
