= Sul Brasil =

Coordinates: 26.7361°S 52.9647°W

- Municipality
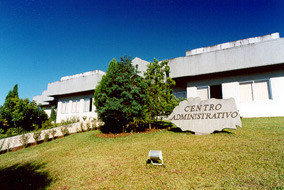

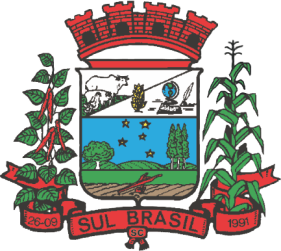
- Flag Coat of arms
- Interactive map of Sul Brasil
- Country: Brazil
- Region: South
- State: Santa Catarina
- Mesoregion: Oeste Catarinense

Population (2020)
  - Total: 2,423
- Time zone: UTC -3

Sul Brasil is a municipality in the state of Santa Catarina in the South region of Brazil. It was created in 1961 by division of the municipality of Modelo.

== See also ==
- List of municipalities in Santa Catarina
