= Iporã do Oeste =

Coordinates: 26.9883°S 53.5353°W

- Municipality
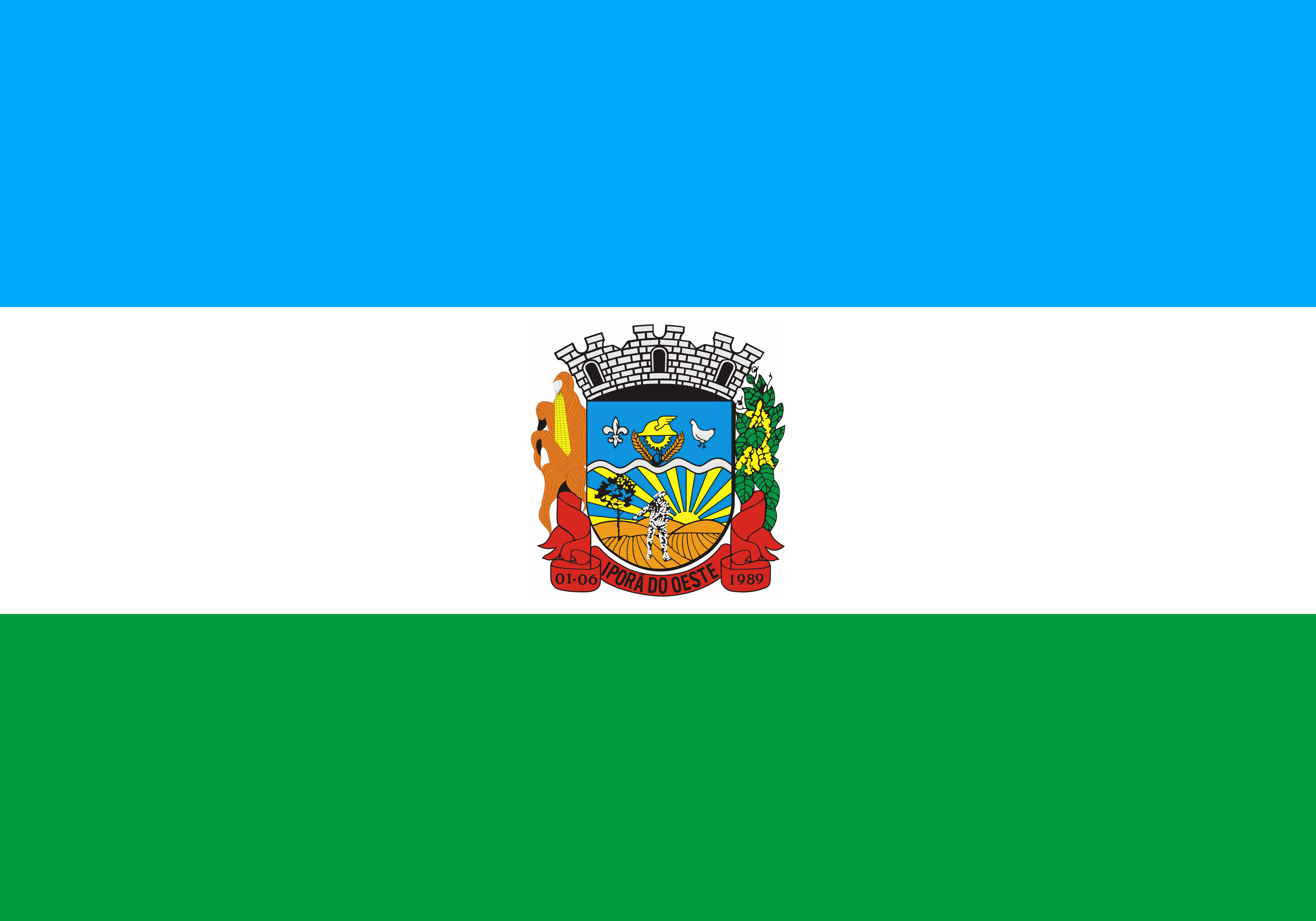
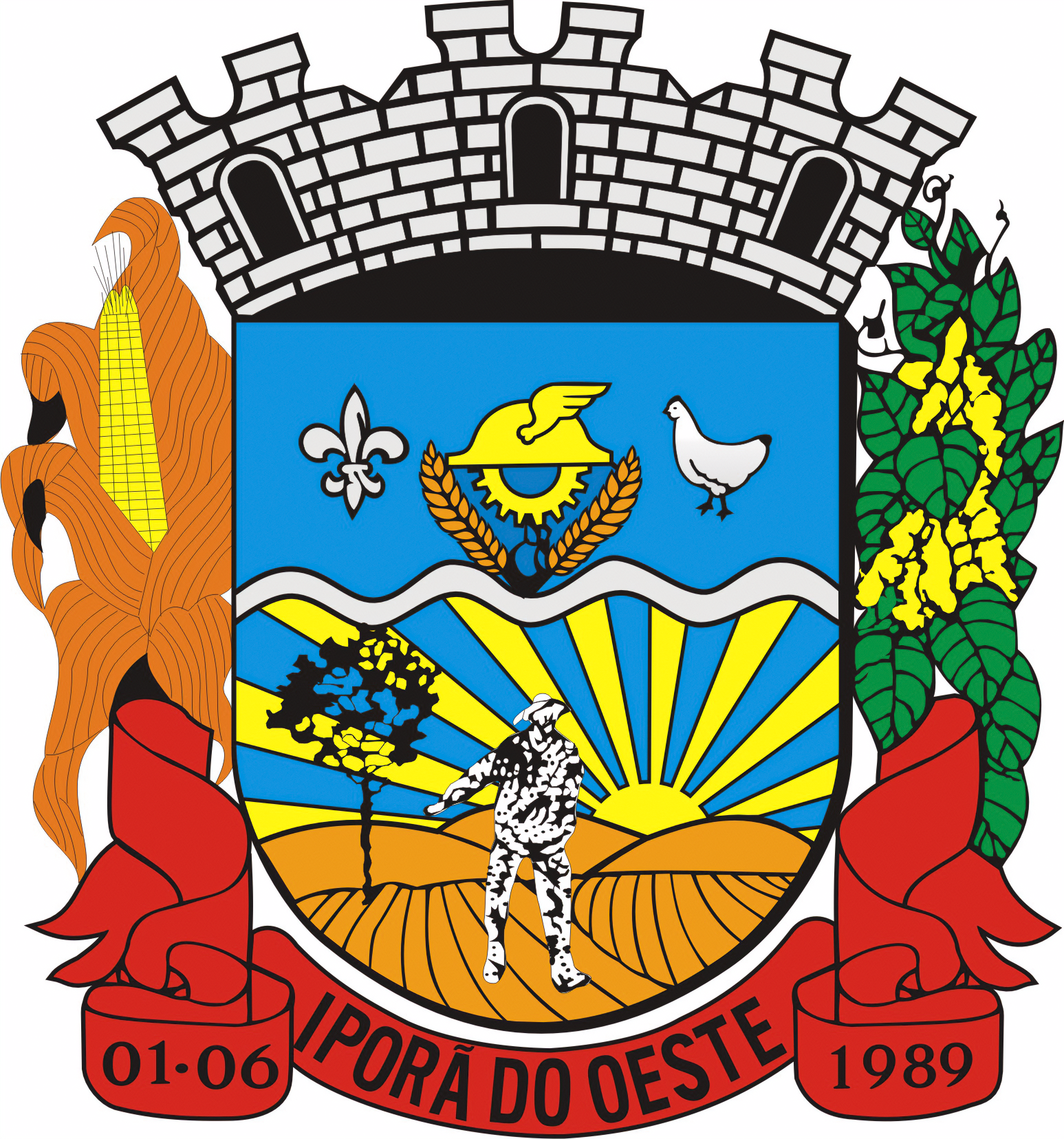
- Flag Coat of arms
- Interactive map of Iporã do Oeste
- Country: Brazil
- Region: South
- State: Santa Catarina
- Mesoregion: Oeste Catarinense

Population (2020)
  - Total: 9,045
- Time zone: UTC -3
- Website: www.ipora.sc.gov.br

Iporã do Oeste is a municipality in the state of Santa Catarina in the South region of Brazil.

== See also ==
- List of municipalities in Santa Catarina
