= Tawanda Kanhema =

Zimbabwe photographer and product manager

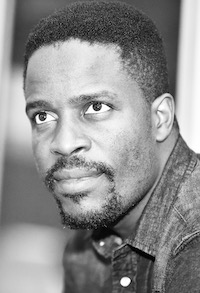
- Kanhema in 2019
- Education: University of California, Berkeley
- Occupations: Product Manager, Photographer

Tawanda Kanhema (born 1981 or 1982) is a Zimbabwean photographer and product manager. He helped map 500 miles of Zimbabwe for Google Street View as a volunteer.

== Early life and education ==
Tawanda Kanhema is from the city of Salisbury, Zimbabwe. He studied documentary film-making and journalism at University of California, Berkeley.

== Career ==
As of 2019, Kanhema was a product manager in Silicon Valley. In 2009, he noticed that Zimbabwe was not represented on Google Street View. He subsequently volunteered to carry the Street View gear across 2,000 mi (3,200 km) of Zimbabwe so that it would be more complete and representative. He captured images in Zimbabwe via helicopter, speedboat, bicycling, car, and hiking. Ultimately, about 500 mi (800 km) of his travels across the country were uploaded to the Street View platform. Kanhema acted as a volunteer for Google for this project, spending US$5,000 of his own money to travel and take the pictures for Street View. In March 2019, he was paid by the Mushkegowuk Council of northern Ontario to document the ice roads connecting their villages for Street View. Kanhema views his efforts as part of a wider effort to make Zimbabwe more attractive and accessible to tourists, and to improve geospatial data availability and quality in the region.

== Personal life ==
In 2009, Kanhema moved from Zimbabwe to the US. He lived in Berkeley, California as of 2019.
