= Serra Alta =

Coordinates: 26.7292°S 53.0422°W

- Municipality
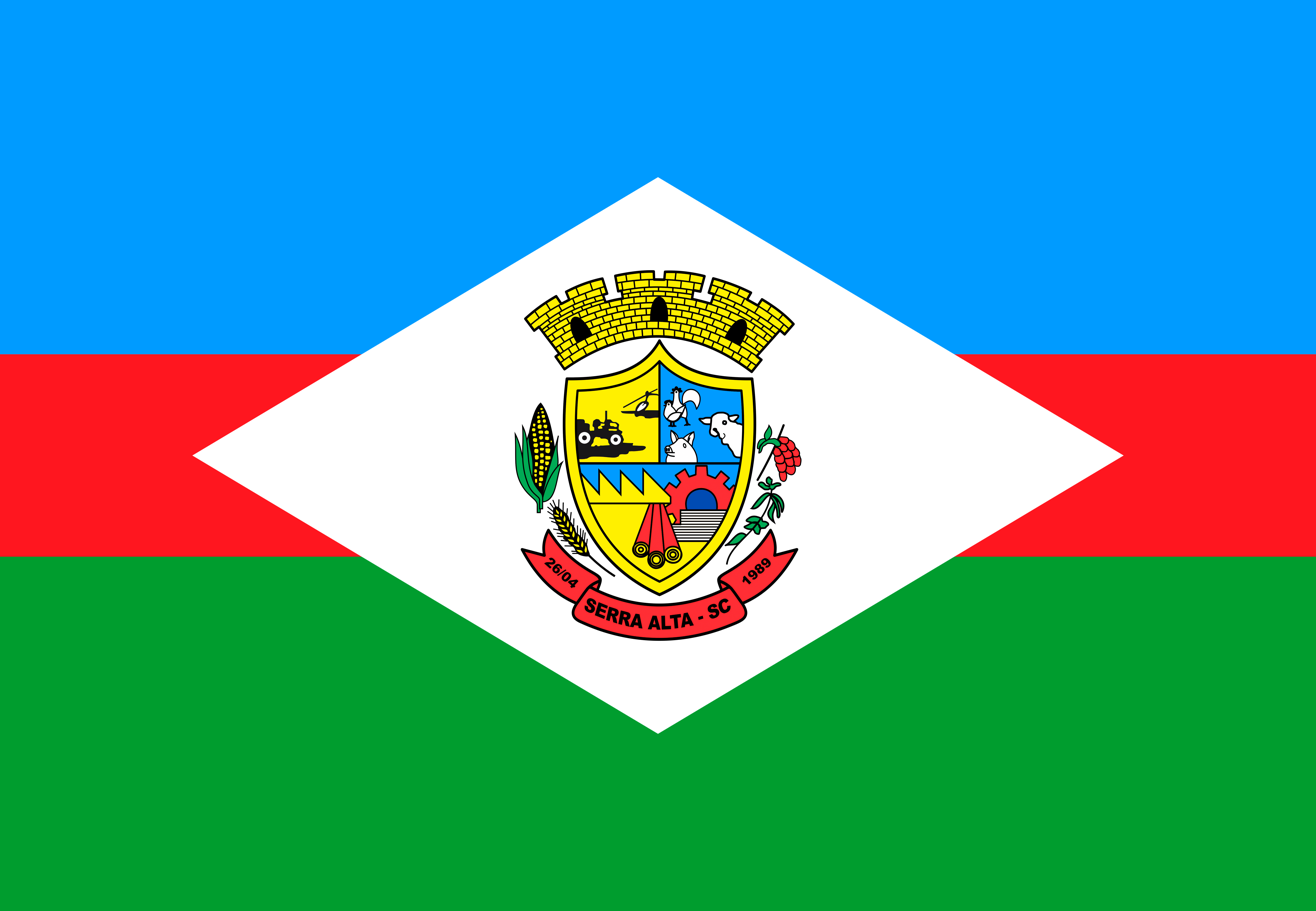
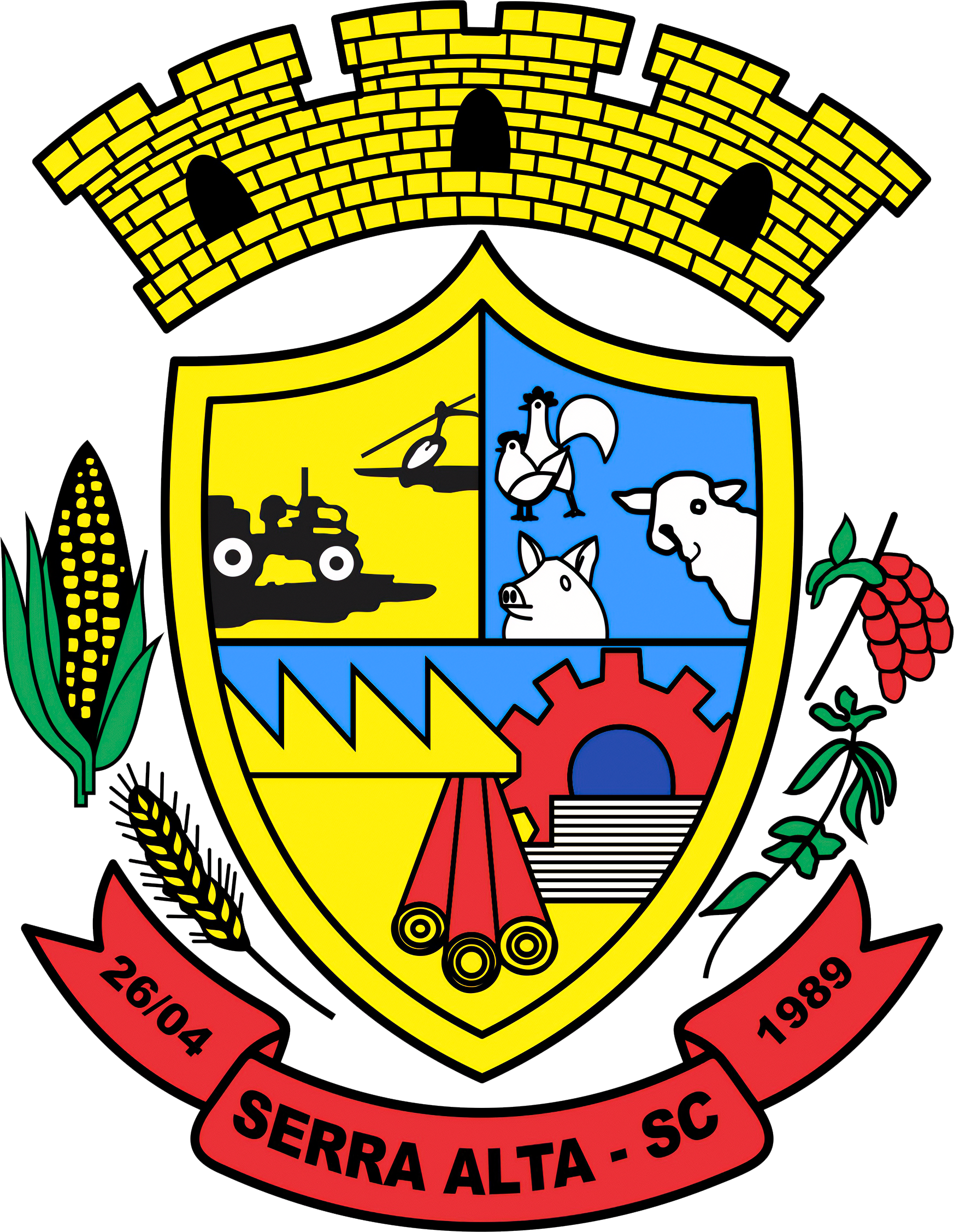
- Flag Coat of arms
- Interactive map of Serra Alta
- Country: Brazil
- Region: South
- State: Santa Catarina
- Mesoregion: Oeste Catarinense

Population (2020)
  - Total: 3,256
- Time zone: UTC -3

Serra Alta is a municipality in the state of Santa Catarina in the South region of Brazil.

== See also ==
- List of municipalities in Santa Catarina
