= Cansanção =

Municipality of Bahia, Brazil

- Municipality
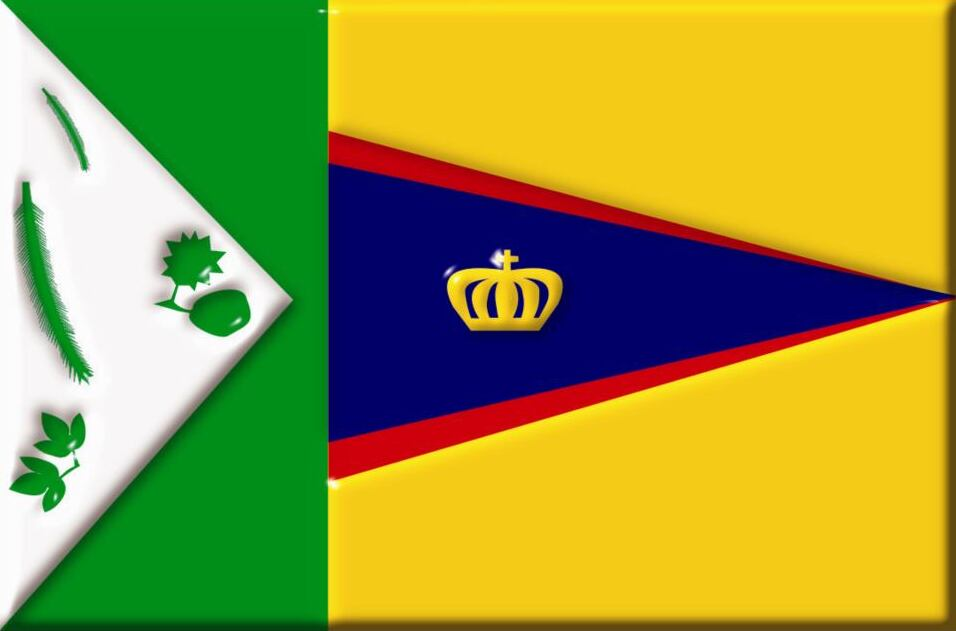
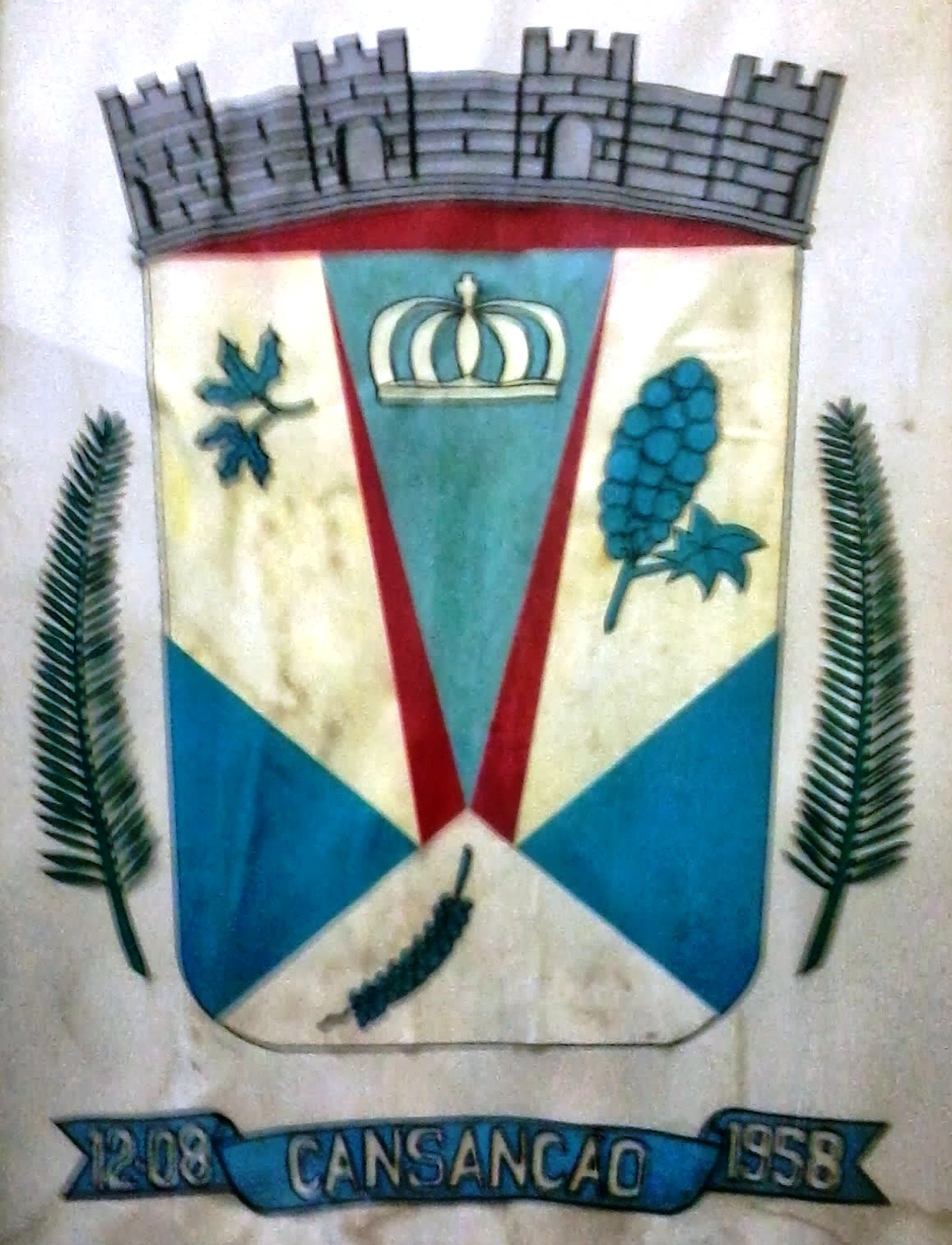
- Flag Coat of arms

- Location in Brazil
- Coordinates: 10°40′15″S 39°29′52″W
- Country: Brazil
- Region: Nordeste
- State: Bahia

Population (2020)
  - Total: 34,882
- Time zone: UTC−3 (BRT)

Cansanção is a municipality in the state of Bahia in the North-East region of Brazil.
