= Google Street View in Asia =

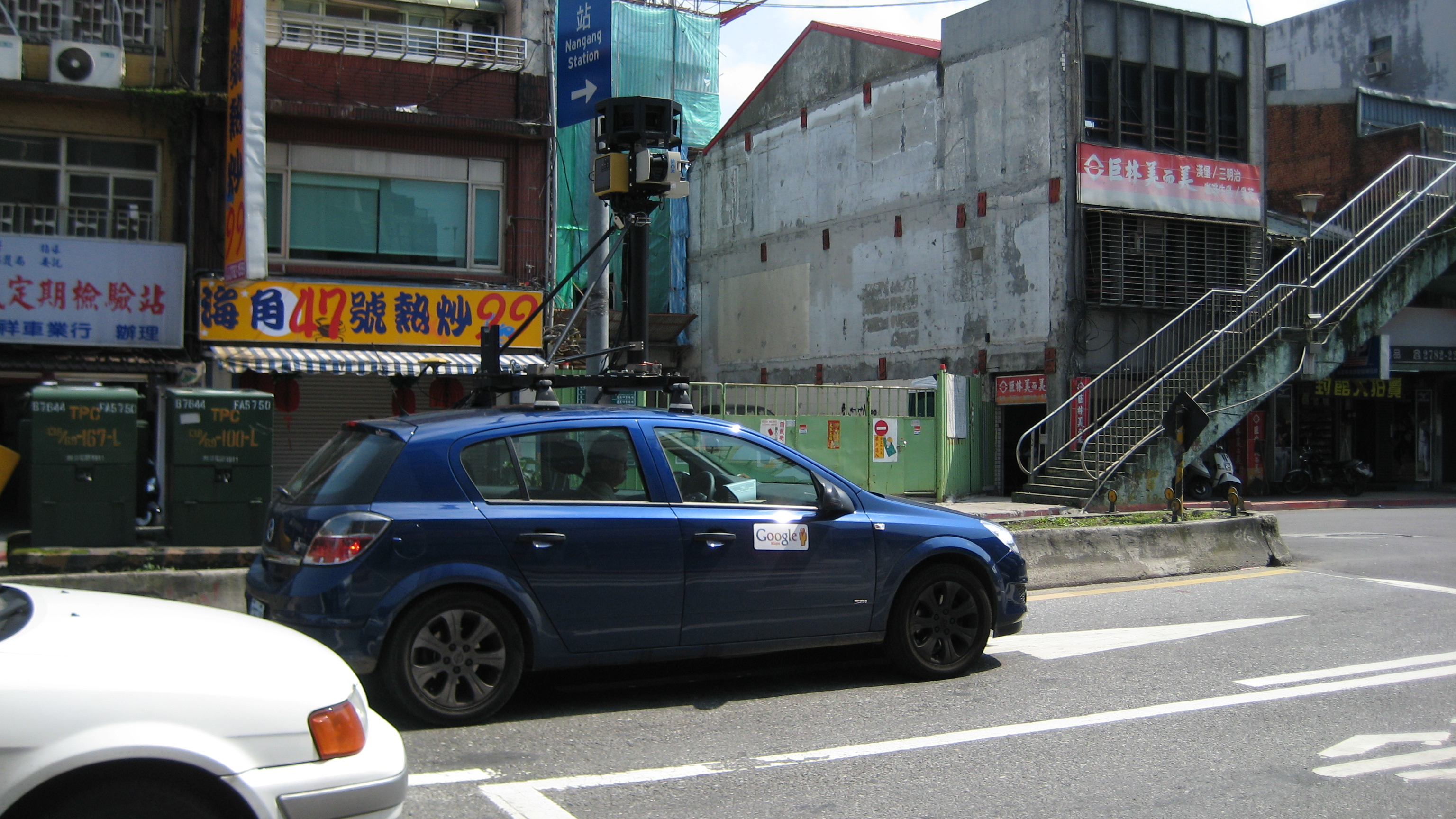
Google Car in Nangang District, Taipei

In Asia, Google Street View is available in Bangladesh, Bhutan, British Indian Ocean Territory, Cambodia, Hong Kong, Indonesia, Israel, India, Japan, Jordan, Kazakhstan, Kyrgyzstan, Laos, Lebanon, Macau, Malaysia, Mongolia, Nepal, the Philippines, Qatar, Russia, Singapore, South Korea, Sri Lanka, Taiwan, Thailand, Turkey, the United Arab Emirates and Vietnam. This includes territories disputed by both Israel (Golan Heights and West Bank) and India (northern Arunachal Pradesh). It is also available for a few select tourist attractions in the Afghanistan, People's Republic of China, Iraq, and Pakistan.

== Timeline of introductions ==
Service in Japan was introduced on August 5, 2008. Japan's coverage was initially concentrated in five areas with a total of 10 camera icons. The service has faced criticisms from bloggers in Japan of cultural insensitivity.

On May 26, 2011, Google announced that, in India, capturing of Street View images in Bangalore, the capital of the state of Karnataka, had started. However, Google Street View was banned from Bangalore on June 21, 2011.

On September 2, 2011, Google has revealed that its Street View feature will be introduced to the country in association with the Tourism Authority of Thailand.

On September 3, 2011, Google started to collaborate with Tourism Malaysia to record Malaysian locations to be featured on its Google Map Street View.

On January 24, 2012, Google Street View was launched in South Korea starting with imagery from the country's capital, Seoul, as well as South Korea's second largest city, Busan.

Google Street View in Jordan was launched in November 2015 which included 43 archaeological sites. On the announcement day, Queen Rania wrote on the announcement and praised tourism enhancing efforts in Jordan.

Since March 2022, a large amount of Street view, taken by Google since November 2021, has been added in Bangladesh. This coverage covers mostly agricultural areas of Dhaka Division, and as of April 2022 it continues to expand every few days.

On July 27, 2022, Google added street view coverage in ten major cities of India and its surroundings, ending the 11-year-old ban on Google Street View. The footage is shot from Tech Mahindra and Genesys companies and licensed to Google. There is planning for a rollout of the service in national level, and there are daily additions of Indian roads into the platform.

On March 22, 2024, Google added street view coverage throughout the country of Kazakhstan, covering all regions. The coverage mostly consists of major roads and urban areas.

In April 2024, Google added street view coverage in Lebanon.

In January 2025, Google added street view in Coron in The Philippines.

In June 2025, Google restored street view in Vietnam, but no announcements were made about it.

== Areas covered ==
=== Afghanistan ===
In 2018, Google Street View was released in Afghanistan for few buildings in Kabul, but is very limited in scope.

For unknown reasons, the blue path of Street View in some buildings in Kabul had been removed.

Region	Major cities/areas
Kabul	Morad-Khani

=== Bangladesh ===
District/Region	Major cities/areas
Sylhet	roads all over the Sylhet city
Dhaka	roads all over the Dhaka city
Chittagong	roads all over the Chittagong city
Khulna	roads all over the Khulna city
Dhaka–Chittagong Highway	Complete coverage through Dhaka–Chittagong highway route.
Dhaka–Khulna Highway	Complete coverage through Dhaka–Khulna highway route.
Khulna–Shamnagar Highway	Complete coverage through Khulna–Shamnagar highway route.
Cox's Bazar	Several tourist attractions, Marine Drive Rd, Beach Area and some roads across the town.

=== Bhutan ===
Area
Most major roads in the country covered; South and North have very little coverage

=== Cambodia ===
Area
Major roads and some landmarks

=== Mainland China ===
In China, there are coverage for some attractions in cities and towns on Google Maps including:

Region	Major cities/areas
Sichuan Province	Chengdu Research Base of Giant Panda Breeding; Sichuan Museum; Jinsha Site Museum; Sanxingdui Museum
Beijing	Ullens Center for Contemporary Art; Forbidden City; The Central Academy of Fine Arts; Minzu University of China Museum; Zhuozhan Shopping Center (Translate to Chinese); Beijing Institute of Fashion Technology Library; Galaxy SOHO; Today Art Museum
Jiangsu Province	Taipingtianguo Zhongwang Mansion; Suzhou Museum; He Garden (Translate to Chinese); Geyuan (Translate to Chinese); Dongmen Relic Site; China Paper-cutting Museum; Yangzhou Museum; The Museum of Guangling King's Tomb in Han Dynasty
Zhejiang Province	China Silk Museum; Bang Wan Theatre (Translate to Chinese); Grass and Wood Natural Color Dyehouse (Translate to Chinese); Muxin Art Gallery; Wu General Tomb; Water Theater (Translate to Chinese); Hangzhou Arts and Crafts Museum; Wuzhen Grand Theatre (Translate to Chinese); Taoxuchang Pickles; Zhaoming Academy; Three-Inch Golden Lotus Pavilion (Translate to Chinese); Shen Family Theater (Translate to Chinese); Sanbai Brewery; Yida Silk Workshop (Translate to Chinese); Guandi Temple; Lianlishu
Hubei Province	Hubei Museum
Shanghai	Shanghai Museum of Contemporary Art (Translate to Chinese); Long Museum
Shandong Province	Zibo Zhoucun People's Government; Zhoucun Ancient Town（North Gate）; Qianfosi（South Gate）; Daranfang; Zibo Yishu Museum (Small coverage)
Fujian Province	Tianluokeng Tulou (Translate to Chinese); Yuchang Building; Deyuantang (Translate to Chinese); Yunshuiyao (Translate to Chinese); Shanjiao Building; Chengqilou; Qiaofulou; Taxiacun; Changjiao

=== Hong Kong ===
Region	Major cities/areas
Hong Kong	Hong Kong Island, Kowloon, New Territories and Northern part of Lantau Island

=== Macau ===
Region	Major cities/areas
Macau	Macau, Taipa, Coloane and Cotai

=== India ===
In 2016, the Government of India denied Google's request to cover India through Street View photography, citing concerns that military installations or other sensitive areas would be photographed.

In 2022, after a change in government policy, Google was permitted to launch in India; its Street View project in the country is a partnership with Genesys and Tech Mahindra. It competes with MapmyIndia. At launch in July 2022, Street View covered 150,000 km of roads in India; it also formed partnerships with traffic authorities in Delhi, Bengaluru, Hyderabad, Chandigarh, Ahmedabad, Kolkata, Gurgaon, and Agra.

As of October 2024, it is available to some extent in all states and union territories.

Region	Major cities/areas
Andhra Pradesh	All major cities and roads
Andaman and Nicobar Islands	Baratang Island, Middle Andaman (major cities), North Andaman, Shaheed Dweep, South Andaman, Swaraj Dweep
Arunachal Pradesh	Changlang, Itanagar, Khonsa, Miao, Naharlagun, NH13, Roing, some ICBRs
Assam	All major cities and roads
Bihar	All major cities and roads
Chandigarh	Full coverage
Chhattisgarh	All major cities and roads
Dadra and Nagar Haveli and Daman and Diu	Full coverage
Delhi	Full coverage
Goa	Full coverage
Gujarat	Full coverage
Haryana	All major cities and roads
Himachal Pradesh	All major cities
Jammu and Kashmir	Jammu, Kathua, Samba
Jharkhand	All major cities and roads
Karnataka	All major cities and roads
Kerala	Full coverage
Ladakh	Choglamsar, Leh, Sakti
Lakshadweep	Agatti, Amini, Andrott, Kadmat, Kalpeni, Kavaratti, Kiltan
Meghalaya	All major cities
Mizoram	All major cities (except Kolasib)
Madhya Pradesh	All major cities and roads
Maharashtra	All major cities and roads
Manipur	Imphal
Nagaland	NH 702D (up to Changki)
Odisha	All major cities
Puducherry	All major cities and roads
Punjab	All major cities
Rajasthan	All major cities and roads
Sikkim	All major cities
Tamil Nadu	All major cities and roads
Telangana	All major cities and roads
Tripura	All major cities and roads
Uttar Pradesh	All major cities and roads
Uttarakhand	All major cities
West Bengal	All major cities and roads

=== Indonesia ===
Google Street View covers most regencies and cities in Sumatra (except most of Aceh), Java, Nusa Tenggara Islands, Borneo, Sulawesi, and North Maluku (includes Ternate, Tidore, and parts of Halmahera). There is currently no official coverage in Maluku (province) and the Papua region; all coverage in those areas are unofficial. Before 2015, only Java, Madura, and Bali were covered by the Street View.

In October 2019, Google excluded and removed most of the Street View images of Aceh due to a controversial incident. The Banda Aceh City Government considered suing Google about why the inappropriate image can be easily passed and shown to public. Even so, the government still allows Street View recordings in certain places that are not in roadways. The City Government also reported this incident to Ministry of Communication and Information Technology.

Since then, only parts south of Subulussalam; several meters away from border gate between Southeast Aceh Regency and Karo Regency; parts east of Lhokseumawe; a very small (several meters long) fragment of Teuku Nyak Arief Road at Banda Aceh, a fragment of Blang Bintang Lama Road and a Chinese housing complex at Neuheun in Aceh Besar Regency are currently covered in Aceh. In October 2025, Google added Street View coverage in Southeast Aceh Regency to Gayo Lues Regency.

Region	Major cities/areas
Sumatra	All major road, town and cities covered by Trans-Sumatran Highway, including Nias Island, Bangka Belitung Islands, Batam, Bintan Island, and Bengkalis
Java	Full coverage, including Bawean, and Madura
Lesser Sunda Islands	Full coverage in Bali (except Nusa Lembongan and Nusa Ceningan) and Lombok (except Gili Islands) All major road and towns in Sumbawa, Komodo (island), Flores, Sumba, Lembata, Alor Island, Timor
Kalimantan	All major road, town and cities covered by Trans Kalimantan Highway, including Derawan, Laut Island, Nunukan, and Tarakan
Sulawesi	All major road, town and cities covered by Trans-Sulawesi Highway, Lembeh, Muna Island, Buton
North Maluku	Ternate, Tidore, and parts of Halmahera

=== Iraq ===
Region	Major cities/areas
Baghdad	National Museum of Iraq

=== Israel ===
Region	Major cities/areas
Northern District	Kfar Kama, Kibbutz Merhavia
Haifa District	Haifa, Nahsholim
Tel Aviv District	Tel Aviv, Ramat Gan Safari
Jerusalem District	Jerusalem, Mini Israel, Jerusalem Biblical Zoo, Israel Museum
Southern District	Ben-Gurion University of the Negev

The West Bank, which is widely recognised internationally as part of Palestine, is also covered in Street View. The coverage also includes Israeli settlements in the West Bank.

=== Japan ===
Region	Major cities/areas
Chūbu	Niigata, Sado, Nagoya, Gifu
Chūgoku	Okayama, Hiroshima
Hokkaidō	Sapporo, Hakodate, Asahikawa
Kansai	Kobe, Osaka, Kyoto, Nara
Kantō	Chiba, Saitama, Tokyo, Yokohama
Kyūshū	Fukuoka, Nagasaki, Hirado, Kumamoto, Tanegashima, Yakushima, Amami Ōshima, Tokunoshima, Okinawa, Miyako Islands, Kagoshima
Tōhoku	Sendai, Fukushima, Morioka

=== Jordan ===
Region	Sites
North Region	Jerash monuments, Jerash Museum, Ajloun castle, Ajloun Forest Reserve, Ajloun Museum, Umm Qais Archaeological site, Umm Qais Museum, Capitolias (Beit Ras), Pella (Tabaqet Fahl), Rihab church, Umm el-Jimal, Qasr Al-Hallabat
Central Region	Al-Maghtas (Baptismal site), Surb Karapet Armenian Apostolic Church, Amman Citadel, Umayyad Palace, Roman amphitheater, Odeon theater, Jordan Museum, Iraq Al-Amir, Qasr Amra, Qasr Al-Azraql, Qasr Al-Kharanah, Mount Nebo, Madaba Church, Qasr Machaerus, Ma'in Hot Springs, Dead Sea Panorama Complex, Dhiban, Umm ar-Rasas, Qasr Tuba, Qasr Al-Qatraneh, Karak Castle, Lowest point on earth Museum, Lot Cave
South Region	Tafilah, Fenyan eco-lodge, Montreal Crusader castle, Athruh, Aqaba Fortress, Petra

=== Kazakhstan ===
Region	Major cities/areas
Abai Region	Semey, Kurchatov
Akmola Region	Kökşetau, Akkol, Atbasar, Shchuchinsk, Makinsk, Stepnyak, Esil, Ereymentau, Stepnogorsk, Burabay, Derzhavinsk
Aktobe Region	Aktobe, Komsomol'skoe
Almaty	Almaty
Almaty Region	Alatau, Kaskelen, Qonayev
Astana	Astana
Atyrau Region	Atyrau, Inderbor, Kulsary
East Kazakhstan Region	Oskemen, Ridder
Jambyl Region	Taraz, Kulan
Jetisu Region	Taldykorgan, Sary-Ozek
Karaganda Region	Karaganda, Temirtau, Shakhtinsk, Balkhash Saran, Botakara
Kostanay Region	Kostanay, Rudny
Kyzylorda Region	Kyzylorda, Aral
Mangystau Region	Aktau, Zhanaozen, Fort-Shevchenko
North Kazakhstan Region	Petropavl
Pavlodar Region	Pavlodar, Ekibastuz, Bayanaul
Shymkent	Shymkent, Sayram
Turkistan Region	Turkistan, Zhetisay, Kentau
Ulytau Region	Jezkazgan, Satpayev, Karazhal
West Kazakhstan Region	Oral
and major roads

=== Kyrgyzstan ===
Region	Major cities/areas
Bishkek	Bishkek
Chuy Region	Kara-Balta, Sosnovka, Tokmok
Issyk Kul Region	Balykchy, Bokonbayevo, Karakol
Jalal-Abad Region	Jalal-Abad
Naryn Region	Kochkor, Naryn
Osh Region	Osh, Uzgen
Talas Region	Talas
and major roads

- Landmarks: State History Museum, Gumbez of Manas

=== Laos ===
Region	Major cities/areas
Champasak province	Pakse
Louangphrabang province	Luang Prabang
Savannakhet province	Savannakhet
Vientiane Prefecture	Vientiane
Vientiane province	Vang Vieng

=== Malaysia ===
Region	Major cities/areas
Federal Territories	Greater Kuala Lumpur, Putrajaya
Johor	Batu Pahat, Johor Bahru, Kluang, Kota Tinggi, Mersing, Muar, Pekan Nanas, Segamat,
Kedah	Alor Setar, Baling, Jitra, Kulim, Sungai Petani
Kelantan	Gua Musang, Kota Bharu, Machang, Pasir Mas, Tanah Merah, Tumpat
Malacca	Ayer Keroh, Alor Gajah, Jasin, Malacca City
Negeri Sembilan	Bahau, Gemas, Jempol, Kuala Pilah, Naning, Nilai, Port Dickson, Rembau, Seremban, Tampin,
Pahang	Bentong, Cameron Highlands, Cherating, Fraser's Hill, Genting Highlands, Kuala Lipis,Jerantut, Kuantan, Pekan, Raub, Rompin, Temerloh
Penang	George Town Conurbation
Perak	Batu Gajah, Hulu Perak, Ipoh, Kuala Kangsar, Sitiawan, Taiping, Tanjung Malim, Teluk Intan
Perlis	Kangar, Kuala Perlis, Padang Besar
Selangor	Banting, Kajang, Klang, Kuala Kubu Bharu, Kuala Selangor, Morib, Petaling Jaya, Puchong, Rawang, Sabak Bernam, Semenyih, Sepang, Shah Alam, Subang, Subang Jaya
Sarawak	Kuching, Sibu, Bintulu, Miri
Sabah	All major towns
Terengganu	Chukai, Dungun, Kerteh, Jerteh, Kuala Terengganu, Marang

=== Mongolia ===
Region	Major cities/areas
Ulaanbaatar	streets in Ulaanbaatar. Sükhbaatar Square and National Academic Drama Theatre in Ulaanbaatar. Also Bagakhangai, Baganuur, Genghis Khan Equestrian Statue and Night views of center of Ulaanbaatar
Dornogovi Province	Erdene, Sainshand, Züünbayan, Zamyn-Üüd
Orkhon Province	Erdenet
Darkhan-Uul Province	Darkhan
Selenge Province	Züünkharaa, Sükhbaatar, Altanbulag, Khüder
Töv Province	13th Century Complex, Bayan, Erdene, Zuunmod
various	part of Mandalgovi and more locations

=== Nepal ===
Region	Major cities/areas
Sagarmatha Zone	several single shots in an area 10–15 km west/southwest of Mount Everest, including Gokyo Lakes, Gorakshep, Kala Patthar, Namche Bazaar, Tengboche Monastery
Khumbu Region	Lukla, Phakding, Khumjung, Phortse, Panboche, Dughla, Lobuche, Thamu, Thame

=== Oman ===
Upcoming Google Street View coverage for Oman was confirmed in February 2024, and was published in October 2024.

Area
roads all over the country

=== Pakistan ===
District/Region	Major cities/areas
Lahore	Tomb of Muhammad Iqbal, Lahore Museum, Badshahi Mosque, Tomb of Jahangir, Walled City of Lahore, Shalimar Gardens, Quaid-e-Azam Library, Shrine of Hazrat Mian Mir, Tomb of Malik Ahmad Ayaz, Kamran's Baradari, Lahore Fort, King Edward Medical University, Government College University (Lahore), University of the Punjab (Allama Iqbal Campus) and Wazir Khan Mosque
Sheikhupura	Hiran Minar Monument and Park, Tomb of Waris Shah, Sheikhupura Fort
Rawalpindi	Mankiala/ Stupa of Buddha
Kasur	Shrine of famous poet and Sufi saint Bulleh Shah
Sahiwal	Harappa Archaeological Site and Museum
Bahawalpur	Derawar Fort
Chakwal	Katasraj temple, complex of temples, lake and a Buddhist stupa
Jhelum	Rohtas Fort and Museum

=== Philippines ===
Region	Major cities/areas
Metro Manila	Caloocan, Las Piñas, Makati, Malabon, Mandaluyong, Manila, Marikina, Muntinlupa, Navotas, Parañaque, Pasay, Pasig, Pateros, Quezon City, San Juan, Taguig, and Valenzuela
Ilocos Region	Pangasinan, national road from Pagudpud to Laoag in Ilocos Norte, Crisologo St., Plaza Burgos and Salcedo in Vigan, Ilocos Sur, national roads in Agoo, Tubao, Santo Tomas and Rosario in La Union
Cagayan Valley	Cagayan, Isabela, Quirino, Nueva Vizcaya
Cordillera	Flora and Santa Marcela in Apayao, Baguio, La Trinidad and Mount Pulag in Benguet, major roads in Pinukpuk, Rizal and Tabuk in Kalinga
Central Luzon	Bulacan, Bataan, Nueva Ecija, Pampanga, Tarlac and Zambales
Calabarzon	Cavite including the island of Corregidor, Batangas, Laguna, Rizal and Quezon
Mimaropa	Occidental Mindoro, Oriental Mindoro, Marinduque, Romblon, and major roads in Palawan
Bicol Region	Albay, Camarines Sur and national roads in Camarines Norte, and Sorsogon
Western Visayas	Iloilo, Guimaras, Capiz, Aklan, Antique, Negros Occidental
Central Visayas	Metro Cebu and nearby towns including Mactan Island all in Cebu, views of ocean floor near Apo Island in Dauin, Negros Oriental
Eastern Visayas	Biliran, Leyte, Southern Leyte, Eastern Samar, Samar, Northern Samar
Northern Mindanao	Camiguin, Misamis Occidental, Misamis Oriental, major roads in Bukidnon, and major roads in Lanao del Norte including Iligan
Caraga	Major roads in Agusan del Norte and Agusan del Sur, Surigao City and its nearby towns
Soccsksargen	General Santos, South Cotabato, major roads across Sultan Kudarat, Sarangani and Cotabato
Davao Region	Davao City, Davao del Sur, Davao del Norte, major roads in Davao de Oro, and major roads in Davao Oriental
Zamboanga Peninsula	Zamboanga City, Zamboanga del Sur, national roads in Zamboanga Sibugay, Dipolog and Dapitan in Zamboanga del Norte
Bangsamoro	Cotabato City, Lanao del Sur, Maguindanao del Norte, Maguindanao del Sur

=== Qatar ===
Region	Major cities/areas
Doha	Museum of Islamic Art Hamad International Airport
Al Khor	Part of Doha and Al Khor

=== Russia ===
Region	Major Cities/areas
Siberian Federal District	Novosibirsk, Omsk, Krasnoyarsk, Kemerovo, Tomsk, Barnaul, Prokopyevsk, Novokuznetsk, Achinsk, Leninsk-Kuznetskiy, Biysk, Yurga and Rubtsovsk
Ural Federal District	Ekaterinburg, Tyumen, Chelyabinsk, Surgut and other cities
Far Eastern Federal District	Artyom, Birobidzhan, Yakutsk, Irkutsk, Khabarovsk, Blagoveshchensk, Komsomolsk-na-Amure, Ishim, Magadan, Vladivostok, Yuzhno-Sakhalinsk, Gorno-Altaysk, Korsakov, Kyshtym, Kyzyl, Langepas, Nakhodka, Nazarovo, Partizansk, Severouralsk, Tobolsk, Ussuriysk, Zarinsk

For European Russia, see Google Street View in Europe

=== Singapore ===
Google Street View have removed imagery of the following areas from 21 July 2025 (Monday) due to security reasons.

Prohibited Road	From	To	Reason
Admiralty Road West			Naval Driving School
Airport Road			Paya Lebar Airbase, Air Force School
Ama Keng Road			Training Plot 12 (Ama Keng)
Ang Mo Kio Avenue 1	Ang Mo Kio Avenue 8	CTE	Bishan Depot
Ang Mo Kio Avenue 9			Ang Mo Kio Police Division
Bartley Road East			Paya Lebar Airbase, Kim Chuan Depot
Bedok North Avenue 4			Bedok North Bus Depot, Bedok Police Division
Bedok North Road	Bedok Reservoir Road	Tampines Avenue 10	Bedok Waterworks
Bedok North Road			Bedok North Bus Depot
Bishan Road	Ang Mo Kio Avenue 1	Kallang River	Bishan Depot
Boon Lay Way	Toh Tuck Avenue	Tradehub 21	Ulu Pandan Bus Depot
Bukit Batok Street 23			Bukit Batok Bus Depot
Bukit Timah Road	CTE	Kampong Java Road	Bukit Timah Waterworks, Istana, KK Women's & Children's Hospital
Bulim Avenue			Bulim Bus Depot
Business Park Drive			Ulu Pandan Bus Depot
Cantonment Road			Central Police Division
Changi North Way			Changi Prison
Choa Chu Kang Way	Lorong Kebasi	Lorong Bistari	Kranji Camp
Clementi Avenue 4			Former Clementi Police Division
Clementi Avenue 5			Former Clementi Police Division
Clementi Loop			Clementi Camp
Clementi Road			Police Protective Security Command
Clementi Road	SIM University	Brookvale Drive	Maju Camp
Commonwealth Avenue West	Jalan Lempeng	Sungei Ulu Pandan	Clementi Police Division
Compassvale Bow			Hougang Telephone Exchange
Defu Avenue 1			Hougang Bus Depot
Eu Tong Sen Street/New Bridge Road	Hospital Drive	Cantonment Road	Police Cantonment Complex/Central Police Division
Irrawaddy Road			Ministry of Home Affairs
Jalan Bahar	PIE	Jurong West Avenue 3	Jurong Police Division
Jalan Gali Batu			Entrance to Training Plot 6 / Gali Batu Depot
Jalan Kwok Min			Training Plot 6 (Mandai)
Jalan Sungei Poyan			SAFTI City / SAFTI Live Firing Area
Jurong Island	Entire Jurong Island		Jurong Island
Jurong Pier Road			Jurong Island Checkpoint
Jurong Port Road			Jurong Port
Kallang Road	Crawford Street	Rochor River	ICA Building
Kampong Berih Road			SAFTI Live Firing Area
Kampong Java Road			Tanglin Police Division
Keng Lee Road			Tanglin Police Division
Kim Chuan Road			Kim Chuan Depot
Kranji Road			Kranji Bus Depot, Kranji Water Reclamation Plant
Laguna Golf Green			Changi Depot
Lentor Avenue			Lower Seletar Camp and Seletar Bus Depot
Lim Chu Kang Coast Road			SAFTI Live Firing Area
Lim Chu Kang Road	Jalan Bahtera	Sarimbun Avenue	Neo Tiew Buildings
Lorong Asrama			Training Plot 6 (Mandai)
Lorong Danau	Jalan Sungei Poyan	Nanyang Avenue	Chua Chu Kang Camp / SAFTI Live Firing Area
Lorong Kebasi/Mowbray Road			Kranji Camp, Mowbray Camp, Police Dog K9 Unit
Loyang Avenue	Pasir Ris Street 21	Loyang Way	Loyang Bus Depot
Loyang Avenue	Farnborough Road	Loyang Way	Changi Airbase West, Hendon Camp
Loyang Way	Loyang Avenue	Upper Changi Road North	Selarang Camp
Maju Drive			Maju Camp
Mandai Avenue			Mandai Crematorium, Nee Soon Camp
Mandai Road			Mandai Hill Camp and Mandai Camp 2, Mandai Bus and Train Depot
Neo Tiew Road			Neo Tiew Buildings
Old Choa Chu Kang Road			Tengah Airbase, Keat Hong Camp, HomeTeam Academy
Old Tampines Road			Changi Prison
Pasir Laba Drive			SAFTI Live Firing Area
Pasir Laba Road			Pasir Laba Camp
Pasir Panjang Road			Currency House
Pasir Ris Drive 3			Loyang Bus Depot
Peng Kang View			SAFTI Live Firing Area
PIE	Pasir Laba Road	Peng Kang Avenue	Pasir Laba Camp, Jurong Camp and SAFTI Military Institute
PIE	CWT Jurong East	MOBOT Bukit Batok	Bukit Batok Bus Depot
PIE	Tampines Avenue 5	Sungei Bedok	Bedok North Bus Depot, Changi Electrical Substation
Pioneer Road	Pioneer Crescent	Shipyard Road	ExxonMobil Refinery
Pioneer Sector 2			Tuas Naval Base
Rangoon Road			Electrical Substation
Seletar Aerospace Drive	Piccadilly	Punggol Barat Drive	Seletar Camp
Sembawang Road	Yishun Avenue 1	Yishun Avenue 7	Sembawang Airbase, Khatib Camp
Sengkang East Avenue			Sengkang Depot
Shan Road			Ministry of Home Affairs
Shipyard Road			ExxonMobil Refinery
SLE	Woodlands Avenue 12	Mandai Road	Sembawang Airbase, Mandai Depot
SLE	Mandai Crematorium	Upper Seletar Reservoir	Nee Soon Camp
Soon Lee Road			Soon Lee Bus Depot
Sungei Gedong Road			Sungei Gedong Camp
Tampines Avenue 2			Tampines Telephone Exchange
Tampines Avenue 5			Tampines Telephone Exchange
Tampines Road	Tampines Link	KPE	Paya Lebar Airbase and Paya Lebar Ammunition Depot
Tanah Merah Coast Road			Changi Naval Base
Toh Tuck Avenue	Toh Tuck Link	PIE	Ulu Pandan Depot
Transit Road			Nee Soon Camp
Tuas Checkpoint			Tuas Checkpoint
Tuas West Drive	Tuas Link MRT Station	Jalan Ahmad Ibrahim	Tuas Depot
Tuas West Road			Tuas Depot
Upper Bukit Timah Road	Cashew Road	Bukit Panjang Road	Ministry of Defence HQ
Upper Changi Road North	Tanah Merah Besar Road	Changi North Street 1	Changi Prison
Upper East Coast Road	Upper East Coast Bus Terminal	Sungei Bedok MRT Station	Bedok Camp
Upper Jurong Road	Benoi Road	Jurong West Street 93	Jurong Camp and SAFTI Military Institute
Woodlands Avenue 3			Woodlands Police Division
Woodlands Checkpoint			Woodlands Checkpoint
Woodlands Industrial Park E4 and Industrial Park E9			Woodlands Bus Depot
Woodlands Road	KJE	Gali Batu Close	Gali Batu Depot
Wrexham Avenue			SAFTI Live Firing Area
Wrexham Drive			SAFTI Live Firing Area
Wrexham Road			SAFTI Live Firing Area / Singapore Rail Test Centre
Xilin Avenue	Upper Changi Road East	Laguna Golf Green	Former Changi Depot (To be reactivated)
Yio Chu Kang Crescent			Seletar Bus Depot
Yio Chu Kang Road			ST Engineering, NCS Hub

=== South Korea ===
Region	Major cities/areas
Seoul	All 25 districts of Seoul.
Busan	Major districts of Busan.
Incheon	Parts of Yeongjong-do including Incheon International Airport.
Gyeonggi-do	Gwacheon, Anyang, Bucheon, Gimpo, Goyang, Guri, Gwangmyeong, Hanam, Namyangju, Seongnam, Siheung, Suwon, Uiwang and Yongin.
Gyeongsangnam-do	Parts of Gimhae and Yangsan.

=== Sri Lanka ===
Area colombo
All major roads and most other roads.

=== Taiwan ===
Full Coverage

Region	Major cities/areas
Northern Taiwan	Taipei City, New Taipei City, Taoyuan City, Hsinchu County
Central Taiwan	Taichung City, Changhua County
Southern Taiwan	Chiayi County, Chiayi City, Tainan City, Kaohsiung City, Pingtung County
Eastern Taiwan	Ilan County, Hualien County, Taitung County
Outlying Islands	Kinmen County, Lienchiang County

=== Thailand ===
Region	Major cities/areas
Northern Thailand	Chiang Mai, Chiang Rai, Lampang, Lamphun, Mae Hong Son, Nan, Phayao, Phrae, Uttaradit
Northeastern Thailand	Amnat Charoen, Bueng Kan, Buriram, Chaiyaphum, Kalasin, Khon Kaen, Loei, Maha Sarakham, Mukdahan, Nakhon Phanom, Nakhon Ratchasima, Nong Bua Lamphu, Nong Khai, Roi Et, Sakon Nakhon, Surin, Sisaket, Ubon Ratchathani, Udon Thani, Yasothon
Central Thailand	Ang Thong, Ayutthaya, Bangkok, Chai Nat, Kamphaeng Phet, Lopburi province, Nakhon Nayok, Nakhon Pathom, Nakhon Sawan, Nonthaburi, Pathum Thani, Phetchabun, Phichit, Phitsanulok, Saraburi, Samut Prakan, Samut Sakhon, Samut Songkhram, Sing Buri, Sukhothai, Suphan Buri, Uthai Thani
Eastern Thailand	Chachoengsao, Chanthaburi, Chonburi, Prachin Buri, Rayong, Sa Kaeo, Trat
Western Thailand	Kanchanaburi, Phetchaburi, Prachuap Khiri Khan, Ratchaburi, Tak
Southern Thailand	Chumphon, Krabi, Nakhon Si Thammarat, Narathiwat, Pattani, Phang Nga, Phatthalung, Phuket, Ranong, Satun, Songkhla, Surat Thani, Trang, Yala

=== Turkey ===
Region	Major cities/areas
Adana	Ceyhan, Çukurova, İmamoğlu, Kozan, Saimbeyli, Sarıçam, Seyhan, Yüreğir
Ankara	Anıtkabir
Istanbul	SALT institution, Pera Museum; indoor views
Çanakkale Province	Landmarks on southern part of Gallipoli peninsula

=== United Arab Emirates ===
Region	Major cities/areas
Dubai	Most major roads, Dubai International Airport (including inside views of an Airbus A380 25.242748°N 55.37196°E), Burj Khalifa
Abu Dhabi	Sheikh Zayed Grand Mosque

=== United Kingdom ===
==== British Indian Ocean Territory ====
Area
Sea Cow Island (a.k.a. Île Vache Marine), Danger Island and Middle Brother Island (a.k.a. Île du Milieu)

=== Vietnam ===
Region	Main areas
Northern Vietnam	Roads and main cities with no limited coverage such as Yên Bái, other main cities with limited coverage such as Thái Nguyên.
Central Vietnam	Roads present in all the region except areas of national parks, main cities such as Vinh, Nha Trang and Hue, smaller cities with limited coverage such as Đồng Hới.
Southern Vietnam	Street view present all around Ho Chi Minh City and Cần Thơ, roads around the region, except coastal areas.

== Controversies ==
As in other places, there has been controversy surrounding plans to bring Street View to various Asian countries.

In Israel, there have been concerns that introducing the service could increase the risk of "terrorism" to which the region is prone.

In India, the Government had rejected Google Street View until June 2022.This was due to privacy concerns. But in June 2022 the Indian Government allowed Street View in many cities of India including the capital city New Delhi. Now it is available in Mumbai, Bangaluru, Chennai and many others. Security establishments became wary of allowing such image capturing given that planning for the 2008 terrorist attacks in Mumbai is believed to have involved photographic reconnaissance of targets by Pakistani American David Coleman Headley. The Indian Government had plans to talk about Google Street View in India, but in March 2018 Government of India finally rejected the Google Street View plan citing that this will compromise the country's security. However, many users have uploaded an increasing amount of Street View in various parts of India, such as Bengaluru and Kerala, among many others. Finally in July 2022 Government of India allowed Google to launch Street View services across the country.

Google had to reshoot all images in Japan because the camera cars that took the original photographs were originally too high, leading to privacy concerns. Japanese houses are generally built quite close to the road. Roads are also narrow, often without pavements. Such factors led to privacy concerns with the original photographs.

Police in South Korea raided Google offices in that country in order to determine whether Street View was legal.

In 2013, people in Tambon Sa-iap village, Song district in Phrae province, Thailand, mistakenly believed that the Street View car was surveying the village for the unwanted Kaeng Suea Ten Dam project and blocked it, not allowing it to take photographs. They also arrested the driver and interrogated him to determine if he was working for the dam project. He was released after swearing on the Buddha that his work was not related to the dam project. After confirming his story, the village's leaders apologized for the misunderstanding.

In Indonesia, Google was forced by the Banda Aceh City Government to remove almost every Street View image of Aceh in 2019, leaving exceptions to Langsa, Aceh Tamiang, Southeast Aceh, Aceh Singkil, and Subulussalam City (as well as Street View recordings of certain places that are not in roadways). This incident was caused by some foreigners that were uploading inappropriate images, some of which contain two naked foreigners. One of them wrote the sentence "Protest sharia law." on his hand. The city government discovered this and considered suing Google, as well as asking it why the inappropriate images could be so easily shown to the public. The City Government also reported this incident to Ministry of Communication and Information Technology. With this incident, the government continues to use this as the main reason for defending the Law of Information and Electronic Transactions Act.

== Unofficial coverage ==
- Vietnam: Part of Cao Lãnh (city) and Hà Tiên, Some part of the island like Phu Quy Island, Con Son Island, Ly Son Island
- Myanmar: Partial coverage in major towns and cities including Yangon, Mandalay, Bagan, Naypyidaw, Loikaw etc.
- New Caledonia: Main cities and tourist places
- Indonesia: Parts of Ambon, Maluku
- Indonesia: Views of some highways and the central business districts of Papua
- Brunei: Major parts of the country
- Iraq: Full coverage some major towns and cities including like Sulaymaniyah, Halabja, Sirwan, Koy Sanjaq, Qaladiza, Kalar etc.
- Timor Leste: Roads all over the country
- Bahrain: Full coverage part of the country

== Future coverage ==
- Kuwait
