= Google Street View in Europe =

In Europe, Google Street View began on 2 July 2008 with the route of Tour de France being covered in parts of France and Italy. The service has since expanded to many European countries, while at the same time has been controversial in some countries due to laws and privacy concerns.

== Development ==
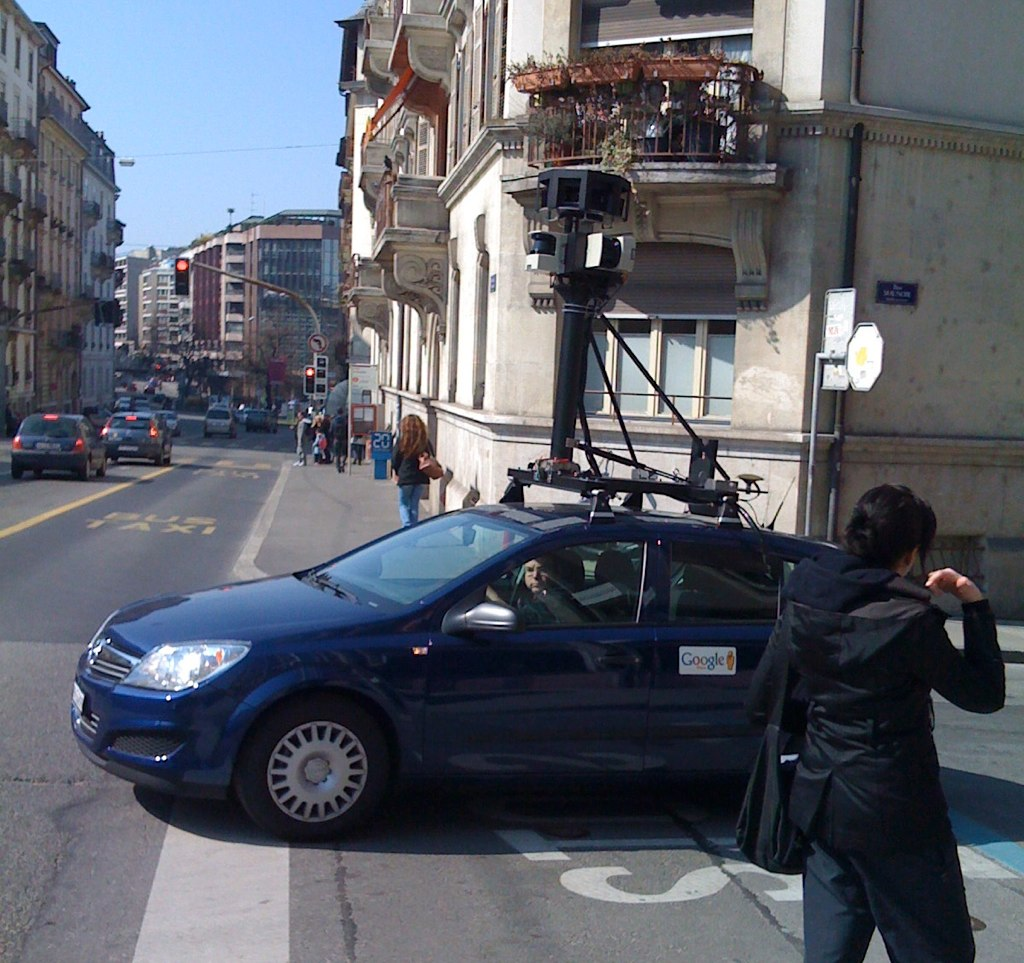
Google's Street View Camera car (Opel Astra) in Geneva, Switzerland, in March 2009.

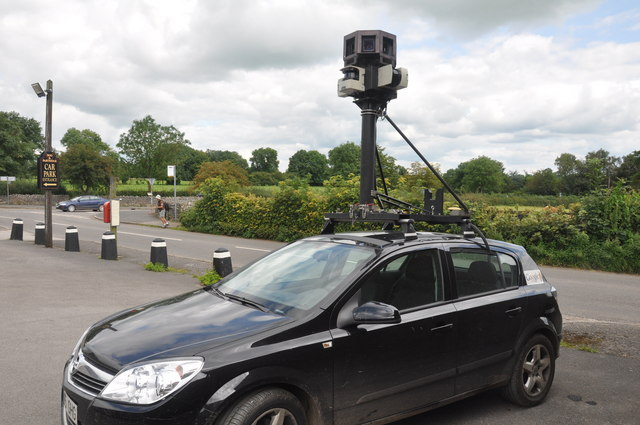
Google Street View camera spotted in Thorpe (near Dovedale) Peak District.

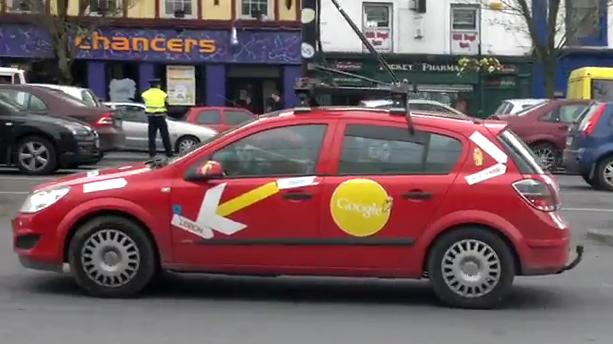
Google Street View car Opel Astra Thurles, County Tipperary, Ireland

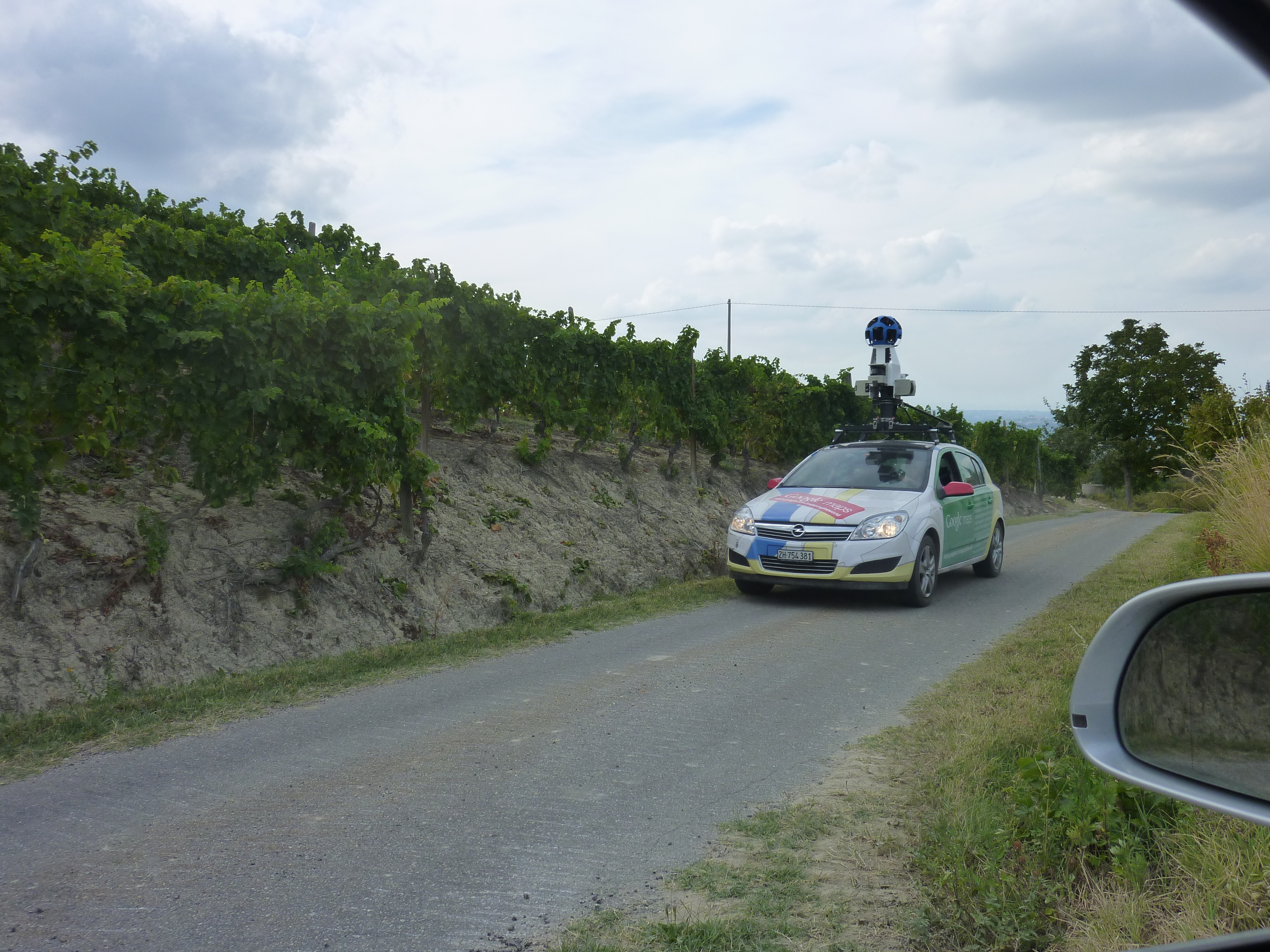
Google Maps Camera Car on a narrow road in the wine region of Langhe, Italy

Following the introduction of Street View in the United States, there was talk of bringing the feature to Europe as well, but there were concerns over the legality of the feature due to stricter laws in most European countries than those of the United States regarding photography.

The first views anywhere outside the United States were introduced on July 2, 2008, when the Tour de France route was added. Nineteen camera icons, each indicating part of a French city or town and Cuneo, Italy, were included.

On October 14, 2008, camera icons were introduced in six French cities, Lille, Lyon, Marseille, Nice, Paris and Toulouse. At the same time, all other icons that had been introduced in France on July 2, as well as the one in Cuneo, Italy, were removed, representing the first time in Street View's history that a camera icon that once marked a place was removed. However, the amount of coverage that France had since July 2 was not diminished.

On October 27, 2008, four Spanish metropolitan areas were added to the list of growing street view locations in Europe: Madrid, Barcelona, Seville and Valencia.

On October 29, 2008, Italy received four camera icons for the localities of Florence, Milan, Rome and Lake Como.

On March 18, 2009, the United Kingdom and the Netherlands were added. In the case of Great Britain, only major centres were uploaded and even coverage of those city centres was incomplete. For example, Edinburgh was missing Street View images of two of its key thoroughfares: Princes Street and the Royal Mile (although portions of both were visible from adjoining streets that had been imaged).

In May 2009, Google Germany released a list of German cities that were to be scanned or rescanned in May and June 2009.

On August 18, 2009, areas in Switzerland and Portugal were added.

On October 7, 2009, parts of the Czech Republic were added.

On November 9, 2009, more locations in the Netherlands and Spain were added.

On December 2, 2009, more locations in France and Italy were added as well as various tourist sites in England.

On January 20, 2010, Sweden and Denmark were added, as well as more locations in the United Kingdom, Italy (7 regions are fully covered), Portugal, the Czech Republic (mostly Prague), and the Netherlands.

On February 9, 2010, Norway and Finland were added, with coverage of much of southern Norway and most of Finland. Imagery was updated for parts of the UK as well.

On March 11, 2010, 95% of the United Kingdom's roads, both rural and urban, covering a total of approximately 238,000 miles, were added. More locations in the Netherlands were also added.

On April 15, 2010, some major UK theme parks were added including Alton Towers, Thorpe Park, Chessington World of Adventures, and Legoland Windsor, as well as the Sea Life Centre in Weymouth.

In May 2010, Google Street View Cars and Trikes were seen in Croatian cities and towns such as Pula, Split, Dubrovnik, and the capital, Zagreb. This brings a Street View September dream to both Croatia and Andorra available.

In August 2010, Google Street View Cars were photographing Jersey, Guernsey and Alderney as well as Slovakia. Also, ten Street View cars were delivered to the Latvian capital Riga.

On September 30, 2010, the Republic of Ireland was added.

On December 8, 2010, parts of Romania were added. More locations in the Netherlands, Denmark, and Norway were also added.

On February 1, 2011, Street Views were added of several art museums across Europe, including the Palace of Versailles, the State Hermitage Museum, the Uffizi Gallery and Tate Britain.

In October 2011, the Bernina Railway between St. Moritz and Tirano was photographed and was added to Street View in early 2012. Bernina Railway is part of the Rhaetian Railway and a UNESCO World Heritage Site.

On November 23, 2011, Street View became available for almost all of Belgium. While Street View content had been recorded earlier, privacy issues kept Google from making it available to the public.

On February 22, 2012, Street View became available for 3 major cities in Russia: St. Petersburg, Moscow, and small parts of Kazan. Museum views were made available in Russia in 2011 for St. Petersburg's Hermitage Museum and Moscow's Tretyakov Gallery. Street Views of Piotrkowska Street in Łódź, Poland were also released.

On March 21, 2012, Street View became available in Poland for most major cities and landmarks.

On April 19, 2012, 5 Ukrainian cities were added: Donetsk, Lviv, Kharkiv, Kyiv, and Odesa.

On May 14, 2012, Estonia and Latvia were added. Nearby Lithuania is currently being photographed.

On September 26, 2012, Croatia and Andorra were added.

On October 30, 2012, Slovakia was added.

On January 31, 2013, Lithuania was added.

On March 8, 2013, Bulgaria and most major cities of Russia were added.

On April 23, 2013, Hungary was added. The Kaliningrad Oblast exclave of Russia was also added and almost all places in Poland and Romania, except for the major cities added earlier.

On October 10, 2013, Iceland was added.

On November 15, 2013, Venice was added, with photographs taken by backpackers and gondolas.

On January 29, 2014 Slovenia and even more areas of Russia were added.

On June 5, 2014, Greece was added.

On July 23, 2014, Serbia was added, with coverage of the three largest cities (Belgrade, Novi Sad and Niš).

On August 20, 2014, more locations in Belgium, Denmark, and Hungary were added. Various waterfalls, geysers, and trails in Iceland were also added.

On September 26, 2014, more locations in Denmark, Hungary and the Netherlands were added.

On October 23, 2014, Luxembourg was added.

On January 21, 2015, more locations in Russia and Romania were added.

On February 18, 2015, more locations in Serbia and Russia were added.

On October 8, 2015, North Macedonia was added. More locations in Ukraine were also added.

On October 22, 2015, Turkey was added. More locations in Bulgaria were also added.

On November 10, 2016, Albania was added, along with Montenegro

On October 28, 2017, Malta and the Faeroe Islands were added.

On July 11, 2018, Austria was added.

On October 26, 2019, Belarus was added with a small coverage of the historical center of Minsk.

On July 25, 2023, Germany was reintroduced with the old coverage removed while 2022 new coverage was released all over the country.

On November 3, 2025, Bosnia and Herzegovina was added, along with Cyprus.

On June 16, 2026, Google officially rolled out full coverage for Georgia, marking the first country in the Caucasus to get coverage.

On July 29, 2026, Kosovo was added.

== Timeline of introductions ==
Note: Nearly all locations in Europe are available in high quality view.

Date	Major locations added
Wednesday, July 2, 2008	2008 Tour de France route: Aigurande, Auray, Bourg d'Oisans, Brest, Brioude, Cérilly, Cholet, Embrun, Étampes, Figeac, Lannemezan, Lavelanet, Nantes, Saint-Malo and more rural areas (Italy) Cuneo
Tuesday, October 14, 2008	(France) Paris, Lyon, Marseille, Nice, Lille, Toulouse
Monday, October 27, 2008	(Spain) Barcelona, Madrid, Seville, Valencia
Wednesday, October 29, 2008	(Italy) Florence, Milan, Rome, Lake Como (including Bellagio, Bellano, Cernobbio, Como, Lecco, Malgrate, Varenna and more
Wednesday, March 18, 2009	(United Kingdom) London, Oxford, Cambridge, Nottingham, Derby, Sheffield, Leeds, Manchester, Bradford, Scunthorpe, Bristol, Norwich, Newcastle upon Tyne, Birmingham, Coventry, Liverpool, Southampton, York, Belfast, Carrickfergus, Larne, Newtownabbey, Cardiff, Swansea, Barry, Glasgow, Edinburgh, Dundee, Aberdeen, Arbroath, Carnoustie, Ellon, Forfar, Fraserburgh, Inverurie, Peterhead, Portlethen, Stonehaven, Westhill and more (France) Paris (metropolitan area: Versailles, Orly, Rueil-Malmaison, Nanterre, Saint-Denis, Boulogne-Billancourt, Champigny-sur-Marne), Amiens, Calais, Dunkerque, Lens, Douai, Tourcoing, Villeneuve-d'Ascq, Valenciennes, Le Havre, Rouen, Reims, Châlons-en-Champagne, Caen, Rennes, Nantes, Angers, Troyes, Strasbourg, Haguenau, Poitiers, Dijon, Clermont-Ferrand, Limoges, Montpellier, Aix-en-Provence, Toulon, Cannes, Antibes, Valence, Romans-sur-Isère, Saint-Étienne, Grenoble (Italy) Turin, Novara, Monza, Busto Arsizio, Udine, Genova, Parma, Bologna, Livorno, Arezzo, Perugia, L'Aquila, Fiumicino, Caserta, Naples, Avellino, Salerno, Bari, Bitonto, Reggio di Calabria, Catania, Cagliari and more rural areas (Spain) Madrid (metropolitan area: Las Rozas de Madrid, Alcobendas, Coslada, Fuenlabrada, Móstoles, Getafe, Arganda del Rey and more), Oviedo, Sabadell, Terrassa, Zaragoza and more rural areas (Netherlands) Amsterdam, Amstelveen, Rotterdam, Groningen, Spijkenisse, Volendam, Zaanstad
Wednesday, June 10, 2009	(France) Disneyland Resort Paris
Tuesday, August 18, 2009	(Switzerland) Bern, Zürich, Basel, Lausanne, Geneva, Neuchâtel, La Chaux-de-Fonds, Bienne, Lyss, Winterthur, Wettingen, Luzern, Thun, Vevey, Montreux and more rural areas (Portugal) Lisbon, Loures, Almada, Barreiro, Montijo, Seixal, Porto, Matosinhos, Vila Nova de Gaia and more rural areas (Italy) Aosta, Domodossola, Latina and more rural areas
Wednesday, October 7, 2009	(Czech Republic) Prague, Mělník, Brandýs nad Labem-Stará Boleslav, Poděbrady, Říčany, Benešov, Příbram, Beroun
Monday, November 9, 2009	(Spain) Málaga, Cádiz, Córdoba, Granada, Jaén, Almería, Huelva, Jerez de la Frontera, Algeciras, El Puerto de Santa María, Marbella, El Ejido, Huesca, Teruel, Calatayud, Oviedo, Gijón, Avilés, Mieres, Palma de Mallorca and southwest of the island, Bilbao, Vitoria Gasteiz, Islands of Gran Canaria and Santa Cruz de Tenerife, Santander, Toledo, Albacete, Ciudad Real, Cuenca, Guadalajara, Puertollano, Valladolid, León, Burgos, Salamanca, Ávila, Segovia, Zamora, Tarragona, Lleida, Girona, Vic, Olot, Figueres, Reus, Badajoz, Mérida, Cáceres, Vigo, Lugo, Ferrol, Santiago de Compostela, Pontevedra, Logroño, San Lorenzo de El Escorial, Aranjuez, Murcia, Cartagena, Lorca, Caravaca de la Cruz, Pamplona, Tudela, Alicante, Castellón de la Plana, Elche, Orihuela, Utiel, Benidorm, Alcoy, La Vall d'Uixó, Vinaròs, Benicàssim and more rural areas (Netherlands) The Hague, Delft, Utrecht, Nijmegen, Arnhem, Amersfoort, Apeldoorn, Almere, Hilversum, Leiden, Eindhoven, Ede, Haarlem, 's-Hertogenbosch, Tilburg, Breda, Helmond, Bergen op Zoom, Dordrecht, Harderwijk, Leeuwarden, Veendam, Veenendaal, Venlo, Drachten, Sneek, Harlingen, Lelystad, Haarlemmermeer, Waalwijk, Oss and more rural areas
Wednesday, December 2, 2009	(Czech Republic) Pedestrian streets and landmarks in Olomouc, Ostrava and Český Krumlov (Netherlands) Pedestrian streets in Enkhuizen (Van Linschotenstraat, Wagenaarstraat and Kooizandweg), Arcen en Velden (United Kingdom) Landmarks as Eden Project, Stonehenge, Bamburgh Castle, Warwick Castle, Kew Gardens, Lotus test track, Coronation Street set (France) Tours, Le Mans, Nancy, Metz, Corsica, Belle-Île-en-Mer, Orléans, Bourges, Vierzon, Saint-Nazaire, Châteauroux, Bourg-en-Bresse, Montbrison, Roanne, Colmar, Mulhouse, Besançon, Annemasse, Chambéry, Avignon, Saint-Tropez, Fréjus, Annecy, Palace of Versailles area (including the Grand Trianon and Petit Trianon) and other locations (Italy) Pompeii, Battipaglia, Siena, Urbino, San Gimignano, Sestri Levante, Asti, Biella, Vercelli, central Benevento, Pontecagnano Faiano, Casertavecchia, some places in Ischia Island and other locations
Thursday, January 21, 2010	(Sweden) Stockholm, Malmö, Lund, Gothenburg, Öckerö, Halmstad, Västerås, Eskilstuna, Nyköping, Uppsala, Norrköping, Jönköping, Linköping, Örebro, Borås, Växjö, Kalmar, Hässleholm, Helsingborg, Skövde, Kristianstad, Karlskrona, Umeå, Piteå, Skellefteå, Luleå, Kalix, Haparanda, parts of Gotland, Fårö and Öland Islands and road connections between major cities (Denmark) Copenhagen, Aarhus, Odense, Aalborg, Randers, Horsens, Skagen, Vejle, Kolding, Roskilde, Aabenraa, Hillerød, Slagelse, Esbjerg, Padborg, Sønderborg, Helsingør, Samsø Island, Ærø, Rømø, Fanø, Læsø Islands and road connections (United Kingdom) Leamington Spa, landmarks as Wicken Fen, Berrington Hall, Baddesley Clinton, Lyme Park, Quarry Bank Mill, Malham Cove, Studley Royal Park, Lindisfarne Castle, Nymans Garden, Avebury Manor & Garden, Corfe Castle, Glendurgan Garden, Angel of the North, Plas Newydd, Inverness, Muir of Ord, Loch Ness area, Largs, Mussenden Temple, Downhill House, Mount Stewart and road connections between major cities that were spotted. (Italy) Verona, Brescia, Gemona del Friuli, Ravenna, Mantua, Cremona, Reggio nell'Emilia, Vicenza, Pesaro, Fano, Pescara, Mestre, Ascoli Piceno, Chieti, Sulmona, Pisa, Lucca, Pistoia, Prato, Campobasso, Foggia, Manfredonia, Potenza, Altamura, Matera, Taranto, Brindisi, Ostuni, Crotone, Catanzaro, Lamezia Terme, Lecce, Sassari, Olbia, Nuoro, Alghero, San Pietro Island, Palermo, San Daniele del Friuli, Syracuse, Ragusa, Agrigento, Marsala, Trapani, Procida, Capri, and road connections between major cities (Czech Republic) South of Brno and more More locations in the Netherlands more locations in Portugal
Tuesday, February 9, 2010	(Norway) Oslo, Fredrikstad, Moss, Sarpsborg, Drammen, Voss, Stavanger, Kristiansand, Bergen, and road connections (Finland) Helsinki, Lahti, Espoo, Vantaa, Tampere, Hyvinkää, Nokia, Mänttä-Vilppula, Hämeenkyrö, Kankaanpää, Valkeakoski, Akaa, Rauma, Uusikaupunki, Lohja, Raseborg, Orimattila, Huittinen, Vaasa, Joensuu, Turku, Salo, Porvoo, Kokkola, Kuusamo, Loviisa, Forssa, Oulu, Raahe, Seinäjoki, Kauhajoki, Kurikka, Ilmajoki, Iisalmi, Pori, Rovaniemi, Tornio, Kuopio, Jyväskylä, Kotka, Savonlinna, Hämeenlinna, Kouvola, Lappeenranta, Imatra, Lieksa, Kajaani, Mikkeli, Jakobstad and road connections between cities and rural areas Mariehamn, Kumlinge, Sottunga, Brändö, Eckerö, Finström, Föglö, Geta, Hammarland, Jomala, Kökar, Lemland, Lumparland, Saltvik, Sund, Vårdö and other places in Åland (United Kingdom) Landmarks in England such as Clumber Park, and some places in Northern Ireland
Thursday, March 11, 2010	Andover, Ashford, Barrow-in-Furness, Basingstoke, Bath, Bedford, Blackpool, Bognor Regis, Bolton, Bradford, Brighton and Hove, Burnley, Cannock, Canterbury, Carlisle, Chatham, Chester, Chesterfield, Chichester, Clitheroe, Colchester, Crewe, Darlington, Devizes, Doncaster, Dorchester, Dover, Durham, Ellesmere Port, Ely, Evesham, Exeter, Folkestone, Gainsborough, Gloucester, Grange-Over-Sands, Grimsby, Harlow, Hartlepool, Hastings, Hereford, Huddersfield, Huntingdon, Ipswich, Kendal, Kettering, Kidderminster, Kingston upon Hull, Lancaster, Leicester, Lichfield, Lincoln, Loughborough, Luton, Maidstone, Mansfield, Margate, Middlesbrough, Morecambe, Northampton, Oswestry, Penzance, Peterborough, Plymouth, Preston, Ripon, Salford, Salisbury, Scarborough, St Albans, Stamford, Stoke-on-Trent, Sunderland, Swindon, Torquay, Truro, Uttoxeter, Wakefield, Warrington, Wellingborough, Wells, Weston-super-Mare, Winchester, Wigan, Winchester, Wolverhampton, Worcester, Workington, Worthing, Yeovil, St David's, Bangor, Newport, Aberaeron, Aberavon, Aberbargoed, Abercarn, Aberdare, Abergavenny, Abergele, Abertillery, Aberystwyth, Amlwch, Ammanford, Bala, Bargoed, Barmouth, Beaumaris, Bethesda, Blaenau Ffestiniog, Blaenavon, Blackwood, Blaina, Brecon, Bridgend, Briton Ferry, Brynmawr, Buckley, Builth Wells, Burry Port, Caernarfon, Caerphilly, Caerwys, Caldicot, Cardigan, Carmarthen, Chepstow, Chirk, Cilgerran, Colwyn Bay, Connah's Quay, Conwy, Corwen, Cowbridge, Criccieth, Crickhowell, Crumlin, Cwmbran, Denbigh, Dolgellau, Ebbw Vale, Ewloe, Fishguard, Flint, Ferndale, Glanamman, Glynneath, Goodwick, Gorseinon, Harlech, Haverfordwest, Hay-on-Wye, Holyhead, Holywell, Kidwelly, Knighton, Lampeter, Laugharne, Llandeilo, Llandovery, Llandrindod Wells, Llandudno, Llandudno Junction, Llandysul, Llanelli, Llanfair Caereinion, Llanfairfechan, Llanfairpwllgwyngyll, Llanfyllin, Llangefni, Llangollen, Llanidloes, Llanrwst, Llantrisant, Llantwit Major, Llanwrtyd Wells, Llanybydder, Loughor, Machynlleth, Maesteg, Menai Bridge, Merthyr Tydfil, Milford Haven, Mold, Monmouth, Montgomery, Mountain Ash, Narberth, Neath, Nefyn, Newbridge, Newcastle Emlyn, Newport (Pembrokeshire), New Quay, Newtown, Neyland, Old Colwyn, Pembroke, Pembroke Dock, Penarth, Pencoed, Penmaenmawr, Pontardawe, Pontypool, Pontypridd, Porth, Porthcawl, Porthmadog, Port Talbot, Prestatyn, Presteigne, Pwllheli, Queensferry, Rhayader, Rhuddlan, Rhyl, Rhymney, Ruthin, Risca, St Asaph, St Clears, Saltney, Shotton, Talgarth, Templeton, Tenby, Tondu, Tonypandy, Towyn, Tredegar, Treharris, Tregaron, Tywyn, Usk, Welshpool, Whitland, Wrexham, Ystradgynlais, Ystrad Mynach, Derry, Omagh, Newry, Antrim, Armagh, Ballycastle, Ballyclare, Ballymena, Ballymoney, Ballynahinch, Banbridge, Bangor, Carryduff, Coalisland, Coleraine, Comber, Cookstown, Craigavon, Donaghadee, Downpatrick, Dromore, Dundonald, Dungannon, Enniskillen, Kilkeel, Larne, Limavady, Lisburn, Lurgan, Magherafelt, Maghera, Newcastle, Newtownards, Portadown, Portrush, Portstewart, Randalstown, Strabane, Warrenpoint, Livingston, Paisley, East Kilbride, Cumbernauld, Hamilton, Kirkcaldy, Ayr, Clydebank, Greenock, Kilmarnock, Perth, Stirling, Coatbridge, Irvine, Dunfermline, Glenrothes, Dumfries, Airdrie, Falkirk, Motherwell, Wishaw, Rutherglen, Cambuslang, Bishopbriggs, Bearsden, Arbroath, Newton Mearns, Musselburgh, Elgin, Bellshill, Dumbarton, Kirkintilloch, Renfrew, Helensburgh, Barrhead, Alloa, Peterhead, Grangemouth, Blantyre, Johnstone, Buckhaven, Port Glasgow, Lanark, Kilwinning, Larkhall, Prestwick, Erskine, Renfrewshire, Bathgate most of roads and all national parks in the United Kingdom (Netherlands) Maastricht, Kerkrade, Geleen, Heerlen, Roermond, Almelo, Enschede, Hengelo, Texel and most of road connections
Thursday, April 15, 2010	(United Kingdom) Alton Towers, Legoland Windsor, Chessington World of Adventures, Thorpe Park, Sea Life Centre (Weymouth)
Thursday, September 30, 2010	Dublin, Cork, Limerick, Galway, Waterford and most of roads in the Republic of Ireland
Tuesday, November 2, 2010	(Germany) Part of Oberstaufen and landmarks as: Bundestag and Victory's Column (Berlin); Königsplatz (Munich); Köhlbrandbrücke (Hamburg); Theaterplatz (Dresden), Castle Solitude (Stuttgart). Adding to it, some football stadiums were added: Allianz Arena, Imtech Arena, Millerntor-Stadion, Signal Iduna Park, Arena AufSchalke, BayArena and Rhein-Energie Stadion.
Thursday, November 18, 2010	(Germany) Berlin, Bielefeld, Bochum, Bonn, Bremen, Dortmund, Dresden, Duisburg, Düsseldorf, Essen, Frankfurt, Hamburg, Hanover, Cologne, Leipzig, Mannheim, Munich, Nuremberg, Stuttgart, Wuppertal.
Wednesday, December 8, 2010	(Romania) Bucharest, Popeşti-Leordeni, Voluntari, Afumaţi, Mogoşoaia, Chitila, Pantelimon, Brăneşti, Jilava, Braşov, Poiana Braşov, Săcele, Bran, Râşnov, Prejmer, Ghimbav, Codlea, Zărneşti, Arad, Oradea, Odorheiu Secuiesc, Făgăraş, Victoria, Miercurea Ciuc, Azuga, Buşteni, Sinaia, Predeal, Eforie and more (Norway) Trondheim, Skien/Porsgrunn, Kristiansand, Tromsø, Tønsberg, Ålesund, Haugesund, Sandefjord, Bodø, Arendal, Hamar, Larvik, Halden, Lillehammer, Harstad, Molde, Kongsberg, Gjøvik, Askøy, Horten, Rana, Kongsvinger, Kristiansund, Jessheim, Hønefoss, Narvik, Alta, Elverum, Askim, Ski, Drøbak, Nesoddtangen, Steinkjer, Leirvik, Vennesla, Stjørdalshalsen, Grimstad, Mandal, Egersund, Råholt, Jørpeland and more (Denmark) Bornholm and more (Netherlands) Terschelling and more places in rural areas.
Tuesday, February 1, 2011	World museums through Art Project including: (Russia) Tretyakov Gallery, Hermitage Museum (Germany) Alte Nationalgalerie, Gemäldegalerie (Spain) Museo Reina Sofia, Thyssen-Bornemisza Museum (Czech Republic) Museum Kampa (United Kingdom) National Gallery, Tate Britain (France) Palace of Versailles (Italy) Uffizi Gallery (Netherlands) Van Gogh Museum, Rijksmuseum Amsterdam
Monday, February 28, 2011	(France) Château de Chenonceau, Château d'Ussé, Château de Villandry, Château d'Amboise (Italy) Palace of Caserta (Republic of Ireland) National Botanic Gardens, Powerscourt Golf Club
Wednesday, March 30, 2011	(Italy) Roman Forum, Colosseum, Palatine Hill, Appian Way, Baths of Diocletian, Piazza del Duomo, Palazzo Pitti, Boboli Gardens, Baths of Caracalla, Villa d'Este (France) Palace of Fontainebleau
Wednesday, June 1, 2011	More locations in France
Wednesday, June 29, 2011	Major part of Isle of Man; Major part of Jersey (Italy) Alessandria, Treviso, Trento, Bolzano, Pisa, Ferrara, Varese, Asti, Tremiti Islands and other locations (Spain) Menorca, rest of Mallorca, Lanzarote, Fuerteventura and more other locations (Sweden) Östersund, Borlänge, Örnsköldsvik, Sollefteå, Gävle, Hudiksvall, Sundsvall and more More locations in Denmark; More locations in Republic of Ireland; More locations in Netherlands; More locations in Norway; More locations in Romania; More locations in United Kingdom
Friday, July 8, 2011	(Monaco) Monte Carlo, Fontvieille, La Condamine
Monday, August 22, 2011	(Switzerland) Landmarks including Three Castles of Bellinzona, the shore of Caumasee, Zermatt ski resort, and other locations
Thursday, October 27, 2011	Full introduction of Google Business Views, including new businesses in France
Monday, November 3, 2011	(United Kingdom) Kensington Gardens, London Zoo, Longleat Safari Park, Greenwich Park, Green Park, Greenwich University, Richmond Park, Bushy Park, Blackpool Pleasure Beach, Chain Pier, Paignton Pier, Land's End, Royal Victoria Park, Mount Edgcumbe House (Denmark) Knuthenborg Safari Park, Legoland Billund, Little Mermaid, Dyrehavsbakken, Tivoli Friheden, Djurs Sommerland, Kastellet, Aalborg Zoo, Aalborghus, Store Restrup Herregård, Den Gamle By, Aarhus Aadal Golf Club, Gammel Estrup, Frilandsmuseet, Bernstorff Palace, Fredensborg Palace, Amaliehaven, Christiansborg, IT University of Copenhagen, Amager Strandpark, Egeskov Castle, Fisketorvet, Den Fynske Landsby, Lake Peblinge Copenhagen, Fælledparken, Eremitage Palace, Østre Anlæg, Churchillparken (Spain) Casa de Campo, Buen Retiro Park, Parque del Oeste and other parks in Madrid; Keukenhof, Efteling, Archeon, Diergaarde Blijdorp, Apenheul Primate Park, Netherlands Open Air Museum, Dutch Water Dreams (Norway) Frogner Park (France) Parc Astérix, Futuroscope, Vulcania (Sweden) Gröna Lund, Skansen, Skånes Djurpark, Nordens Ark, Kolmården Wildlife Park, Slottsskogen, Gothenburg Botanical Garden, Liseberg (Italy) Verona
Thursday, November 22, 2011	(Belgium) Brussels, Antwerp, Ghent, Charleroi, Liege, Bruges, Schaerbeek, Namur, Anderlecht, Leuven, Mons, Sint-Jans-Molenbeek, Mechelen, Ixelles, Aalst, La Louviere, Uccle, Kortrijk, Hasselt, Sint-Niklaas, Ostend, Tournai, Genk, Seraing, Roeselare, Verviers, Mouscron, Bobbejaanland, Plopsaland and almost all places
Tuesday, December 13, 2011	(Spain) Ibiza, La Palma, Formentera, La Gomera, El Hierro islands and Portugalete
Tuesday, January 24, 2012	(Italy) Isola d'Elba
Wednesday, February 22, 2012	(Russia) Moscow, Domodedovo, Podolsk, Khimki, Mytishchi, Vidnoye, Saint Petersburg, part of Kazan and some landmarks as Trinity Lavra of St. Sergius in Sergiyev Posad (Poland) Piotrkowska Street in Łódź
Wednesday, March 21, 2012	(Poland) Warsaw, Kraków, Łódź, Wrocław, Oleśnica, Gmina Oława, Poznań, Gdańsk, Szczecin, Lublin, Białystok, Gdynia, Sopot, Gniezno, Świnoujście landmarks as Malbork Castle, Będzin Castle, Biskupin, Jastarnia, Hel and more (Switzerland) Part of Rhaetian Railway
Tuesday, April 3, 2012	World museums through Google Art Project including: (Austria) Kunsthistorisches Museum (France) Palace of Fontainebleau, Musée de l'Orangerie, Musée du quai Branly, Musée d'Orsay (Greece) Acropolis Museum (Germany) Altes Museum, Pergamon Museum (Italy) Capitoline Museums (Netherlands) Royal Palace of Amsterdam (Russia) Pushkin Museum, Russian Museum (Spain) Museu Nacional d'Art de Catalunya, Palacio de Cristal, Palacio de Velázquez (United Kingdom) Tate Modern
Thursday, April 19, 2012	(Ukraine) Kyiv, Donetsk, Lviv, Kharkiv, Odesa
Monday, May 14, 2012	(Estonia) Tallinn, Tartu, Narva, Pärnu, Viljandi, Jõhvi, Abja-Paluoja, Antsla, Elva, Haapsalu, Jõgeva, Kallaste, Kärdla, Karksi-Nuia, Kehra, Keila, Kilingi-Nõmme, Kiviõli, Kohtla-Järve, Kunda, Kuressaare, Lihula, Loksa, Maardu, Mõisaküla, Mustvee, Narva-Jõesuu, Otepää, Paide, Paldiski, Põltsamaa, Põlva, Püssi, Rakvere, Räpina, Rapla, Saue, Sillamäe, Sindi, Suure-Jaani, Tamsalu, Tapa, Tõrva, Türi, Valga, Võhma, Võru and more areas (Latvia) Rīga, Daugavpils, Bauska, Cēsis, Dobele, Jēkabpils, Krāslava, Jelgava, Jūrmala, Kuldīga, Liepāja, Ogre, Olaine, Rēzekne, Salaspils, Saldus, Sigulda, Talsi, Tukums, Valmiera, Ventspils and more areas (Poland) (Ukraine) UEFA Euro 2012 stadiums
Tuesday, June 19, 2012	San Marino, Borgo Maggiore, Chiesanuova, Domagnano, Faetano, Fiorentino, Montegiardino, Serravalle (Czech Republic) Ostrava, Plzeň, Liberec, Olomouc, Ústí nad Labem, Hradec Králové, České Budějovice, Pardubice, Havířov, Zlín, Kladno, Most, Karviná, Frýdek-Místek, Opava, Karlovy Vary, Teplice, Děčín, Jihlava, Chomutov, Přerov, Mladá Boleslav, Sedlec Ossuary, Terezín, Lidice, Ležáky, Fortress Josefov and almost all places
Friday, July 27, 2012	(United Kingdom) Olympic Park, Olympia Exhibition Hall, ExCeL London, O_{2} Arena, Earls Court Exhibition Centre, Liverpool Lime Street railway station, Manchester Piccadilly station, Leeds railway station, Glasgow Central station, Edinburgh Waverley railway station, Silverstone Circuit, Downing Street and more
Wednesday, September 25, 2012	(Croatia) Zagreb, Split, Dubrovnik, and other locations Andorra la Vella, Canillo, Encamp, Escaldes-Engordany, La Massana, Ordino, Sant Julià de Lòria and other locations
Wednesday, October 10, 2012	(Russia) Landmarks; More locations in: Denmark; Italy; Norway; Sweden; United Kingdom
Tuesday, October 30, 2012	(Slovakia) Bratislava, Košice, Prešov, Žilina, Nitra, Banská Bystrica, Trnava, Martin, Trenčín, Poprad, Prievidza, Zvolen, Považská Bystrica, Nové Zámky, Michalovce, Spišská Nová Ves and more
Wednesday, November 28, 2012	(Norway) Svalbard (Austria) Ski resorts including Sölden and Ischgl (Italy) Ski resorts (Spain) Ski resorts including Sierra Nevada (Switzerland) Ski resorts including Davos
Friday, December 14, 2012	Major part of Gibraltar (Ukraine) Some streets in the city center of Chernivtsi
Wednesday, January 30, 2013	(Lithuania) Vilnius, Kaunas, Klaipėda, Šiauliai, Panevėžys, Alytus, Marijampolė, Mažeikiai, Jonava, Utena, Kėdainiai, Telšiai, Visaginas, Tauragė, Ukmergė, Plungė, Šilutė, Kretinga, Radviliškis, Druskininkai and other locations
Wednesday, March 6, 2013	(Bulgaria) Sofia, Plovdiv, Varna, Burgas, Ruse, Stara Zagora, Pleven, Asenovgrad, Blagoevgrad, Dobrich, Gabrovo, Haskovo, Pazardzhik, Pernik, Sliven, Shumen, Veliko Tarnovo, Vratsa, Yambol, Aytos, Botevgrad, Dimitrovgrad, Dupnitsa, Gorna Oryahovitsa, Karlovo, Kardzhali, Kazanlak, Kyustendil, Lom, Lovech, Montana, Nova Zagora, Petrich, Razgrad, Samokov, Sandanski, Sevlievo, Silistra, Smolyan, Svishtov, Targovishte, Troyan, Velingrad, Vidin and other locations (Russia) Moscow metropolitan area, Tver, Vladimir, Rzhev, Kaluga, Tula, Ryazan, Novomoskovsk, Rybinsk, Yaroslavl, Kostroma, Ivanovo, Kineshma, Kovrov, Murom, Pskov, Smolensk, Bryansk, Oryol, Kursk, Yelets, Lipetsk, Tambov, Stary Oskol, Belgorod, Voronezh, Nizhny Novgorod, Arzamas, Saransk, Penza, Saratov, Kamyshin, Volgograd, Novoshakhtinsk, Shakhty, Volgodonsk, Rostov-on-Don, Novocherkassk, Bataysk, Azov, Taganrog, Yeysk, Elista, Astrakhan, Tikhoretsk, Kropotkin, Armavir, Stavropol, Pyatigorsk, Yessentuki, Kislovodsk, Slavyansk-na-Kubani, Krasnodar, Maykop, Anapa, Novorossiysk, Gelendzhik, Tuapse, Sochi, Adler, Murmansk, Severodvinsk, Arkhangelsk, Vyborg, Petrozavodsk, Veliky Novgorod, Cherepovets, Vologda, Syktyvkar, Kirov, Glazov, Yoshkar-Ola, Cheboksary, Novocheboksarsk, Zelenodolsk, Kazan, Ulyanovsk, Dimitrovgrad, Tolyatti, Samara, Novokuybyshevsk, Syzran, Engels, Perm, Izhevsk, Nizhnekamsk, Naberezhnye Chelny, Bugulma, Votkinsk, Sterlitamak, Salavat, Orenburg, Orsk, Magnitogorsk, Nizhny Tagil, Yekaterinburg, Kamensk, Kamensk-Uralsky, Zlatoust, Miass, Chelyabinsk, Kurgan, Tyumen, Omsk, Nefteyugansk, Surgut, Nizhnevartovsk, Novosibirsk, Tomsk, Yurga, Kemerovo, Prokopyevsk, Novokuznetsk, Barnaul, Biysk, Rubtsovsk, Krasnoyarsk and more locations (Portugal) Funchal, Coimbra, Aveiro, Guimarães, Viseu, Leiria, Évora, Ponta Delgada, Portimão, Póvoa de Varzim, Viana do Castelo, Figueira da Foz, Covilhã, Bragança and more locations Some updates in United Kingdom
Tuesday, April 23, 2013	(Hungary) Budapest, Debrecen, Szeged, Miskolc, Pécs, Győr, Nyíregyháza, Kecskemét, Székesfehérvár, Szombathely, Szolnok, Tatabánya, Kaposvár, Érd, Veszprém, Békéscsaba, Zalaegerszeg, Sopron, Eger, Nagykanizsa and other locations (Poland) Częstochowa, Radom, Sosnowiec, Toruń, Kielce, Gliwice, Zabrze, Sieradz, Bytom, Olsztyn, Bielsko-Biała, Rzeszów, Ruda Śląska, Rybnik, Tychy, Dąbrowa Górnicza, Płock, Opole, Elbląg, Gorzów Wielkopolski, Wałbrzych, Włocławek, Zielona Góra, Żary, Żagań, Lubsko, Nowogród Bobrzański, Nowa Sól, Świebodzin, Sulechów, Tarnów, Chorzów, Kalisz, Koszalin, Legnica, Głogów, Grudziądz, Katowice, Słupsk, Zakopane, Malbork, Łomża, Szklarska Poręba, Leszno, Rawicz, Bolesławiec and other locations (Romania) Timișoara, Iași, Cluj-Napoca, Constanța, Craiova, Galați, Ploiești, Brăila, Pitești, Sibiu, Bacău, Târgu Mureș, Baia Mare, Buzău, Botoșani, Satu Mare, Râmnicu Vâlcea, Drobeta-Turnu Severin, Suceava, Târgu Jiu, Piatra Neamț, Târgoviște, Focșani, Bistrița, Tulcea, Reșița, Slatina, Alba Iulia, Călărași, Deva, Hunedoara, Giurgiu, Sfântu Gheorghe, Zalău, Vaslui, Bârlad, Roman, Mediaș, Turda, Slobozia, Alexandria, Lugoj, Medgidia, Onești, Sighetu Marmației, Petroșani, Mangalia, Aleșd, Câmpina, Dej, Reghin, Pașcani, Năvodari, Râmnicu Sărat, Tecuci, Mioveni, Câmpulung, Caracal, Sighișoara, and other locations (Ukraine) Some landmarks including Palanok Castle, Chernivtsi University, Khotin Fortress, Kachanivka Cultural Reserve (Italy) Pantelleria, part of Lampedusa and more locations (Russia) Kaliningrad Oblast and other locations More locations in France (Portugal) Pena National Palace (Republic of Ireland) Kilkenny Castle
Monday, May 20, 2013	World museums through Google Art Project including: (Austria) Kaiserliche Wagenburg Wien, Kunsthistorisches Museum – Neue Burg; Hirschsprung Collection, Ny Carlsberg Glyptotek, Statens Museum for Kunst, Skagens Museum, Thorvaldsen Museum, National Museum of Denmark (Finland) Ateneum (France) Musée d'art moderne André Malraux (Germany) Museum Kunstpalast, Städel (Greece) Monastery of Saint John the Theologian (Norway) National Museum of Art, Architecture and Design (Sweden) Nationalmuseum (Switzerland) Beyeler Foundation, Musée d'ethnographie de Neuchâtel (United Kingdom) Serpentine Gallery
Thursday, June 13, 2013	Over 1,000 tourist spots, including destinations in: Denmark; Spain
Thursday, July 4, 2013	(United Kingdom) Diagon Alley movie set
Monday, July 15, 2013	(Belgium) 16, Rue de la Loi (Prime Minister Office) and Lambermont (Prime Minister Residence)
Tuesday, July 16, 2013	(France) Eiffel Tower, in Paris
Wednesday, August 14, 2013	(United Kingdom) TARDIS from the television programme Doctor Who in London (Finland) More locations and some updates
Tuesday, September 3, 2013	(Spain) Update and more locations (Poland) Wieliczka Salt Mine
Wednesday, September 25, 2013	(France) (Switzerland) Some CERN sites including Large Hadron Collider, ALICE, ATLAS and more others
Monday, October 7, 2013	World museums through Art Project including: (Italy) La Venaria Reale (Luxembourg) Mudam (Hungary) Museum of Applied Arts in Budapest (France) Palace of Versailles (Norway) The International Museum of Children's Art
Thursday, October 10, 2013	Reykjavík, Kópavogur, Hafnarfjörður, Akureyri, Keflavík, Mosfellsbær, Akranes, Selfoss, and more locations in Iceland
Monday, October 28, 2013	(United Kingdom) Water views of River Thames in London, views of HMS Ocelot and indoor views of London Gatwick Airport
Thursday, November 14, 2013	(Italy) Venice and more locations More locations in France; More locations in Iceland
Wednesday, November 20, 2013	(Italy) Catacomb of Priscilla in Rome
Friday, December 6, 2013	Google Art Project museums including: (France) Villa Ephrussi de Rothschild, Musée des arts et métiers
Wednesday, January 29, 2014	(Slovenia) Ljubljana, Maribor, Celje, Kranj, Velenje, Koper, Novo Mesto, Ptuj, Trbovlje, Kamnik, Jesenice, Nova Gorica, Domžale, Škofja Loka, Murska Sobota, Izola, and other locations (Russia) Yakutsk, Irkutsk, Khabarovsk, Blagoveshchensk, Komsomolsk-na-Amure, Krasnaya Polyana, Ishim, Vladivostok, Yuzhno-Sakhalinsk, Alexeyevka, Anzhero-Sudzhensk, Apatity, Arsk, Artyom, Belebey, Belorechensk, Birobidzhan, Borisoglebsk, Borisovka, Borovichi, Buzuluk, Chapayevsk, Cherkessk, Gorno-Altaysk, Goryachy Klych, Gubkin, Kandalaksha, Kingisepp, Korocha, Korsakov, Kyshtym, Kyzyl, Labinsk, Langepas, Lyudinovo, Magadan, Nakhodka, Nazarovo, Partizansk, Pochep, Revda, Rostov, Satka, Severouralsk, Shlisselburg, Suzdal, Tobolsk, Tsivilsk, Ukhta, Ust'-Labinsk, Ussuriysk, Vyazma, Zarinsk and more locations
Thursday, February 20, 2014	(Italy) Ducati Museum
Thursday, March 27, 2014	(France) Palais Garnier
Tuesday, April 15, 2014	(United Kingdom) Landmarks, including waterways such as Pontcysyllte Aqueduct, Bingley Five Rise Locks, and Little Venice
Friday, April 18, 2014	(France) Several wineries such as Château Lafon-Rochet, Château La Conseillante, Château Coutet, Château Corbin Michotte, Château La Brède, Château Malle, Pressac, Château d'Agassac, Saint-Emilion and Museum of Aquitaine
Monday, April 21, 2014	(Ukraine) Chernobyl; More locations in: Poland; Hungary; United Kingdom; Russia
Sunday, May 18, 2014	(Turkey) Anıtkabir in Ankara
Wednesday, June 4, 2014	(Greece) Athens, Thessaloniki, Patras, Heraklion, Larissa, Volos, Rhodes, Ioannina, Chania, Chalcis, Agrinio, Katerini, Trikala, Serres, Lamia, Alexandroupoli, Kozani, Kavala, Kalamata, Veria, Komotini, Corfu, Mytilene, Tripoli, Mykonos, Naxos, Paros, Santorini and more locations More locations in Hungary
Wednesday, June 4, 2014	(United Kingdom) Alnwick Castle and Edinburgh Castle (Austria) Österreichring and the nearby Enduro, Gokart and 4-Wheel test tracks
Wednesday, July 23, 2014	(Serbia) Belgrade, Novi Sad, Niš, Pančevo, Stara Pazova, Nova Pazova, Inđija and more locations
Friday, August 8, 2014	(Republic of Ireland) Trinity College (United Kingdom) University of Glasgow
Wednesday, August 20, 2014	Update and more locations in: Belgium; Denmark; More locations in Hungary (Iceland) Various waterfalls, geysers, and trails
Tuesday, September 9, 2014	(Turkey) Pera Museum, SALT Galata in Istanbul
Friday, September 12, 2014	(Finland) Alvar Aalto works including Finlandia Hall, Kulttuuritalo, Säynätsalo Town Hall and more
Friday, September 26, 2014	(Russia) Apatity, Barguzin, Bratsk, Chulman, Dombay, Kirovsk, Lesosibirsk, Ulan Ude, Chita, Neryungri, Nikel, Nogliki, Okha, Olkhon Island, Petropavlovsk-Kamchatsky, Ust-Barguzin, Ust-Ilimsk, Ust-Kut, Vanino, Vorkuta, Yelizovo, Zapolyarny and more locations (Denmark) Update and more locations More locations in: Hungary the Netherlands
Friday, October 3, 2014	(Switzerland) Mountain trails (Russia) Sochi Autodrom
Thursday, October 23, 2014	Luxembourg City, Esch-sur-Alzette, Differdange, Dudelange, Ettelbruck, Diekirch, Wiltz, Echternach, Rumelange, Grevenmacher, Remich, Vianden and more locations
Thursday, October 30, 2014	(Romania) Bran Castle; The "Lake" underneath the Opéra Garnier, Paris, France (cf. The Phantom of the Opera) (Italy) Museo della Stregoneria di Triora (Slovakia) Čachtice Castle
Wednesday, January 21, 2015	(Belgium) Landmarks including Walloon Parliament in Namur, Citadel of Dinant and Mardasson Memorial in Bastogne; More locations in: Russia; Romania
Wednesday, February 18, 2015	(Serbia) Sremska Mitrovica, Ruma, Šabac, Loznica, Vršac, Kovin, Smederevo, Požarevac, Knjaževac, Prokuplje, Kuršumlija, Leskovac, Pirot, Surdulica and more locations (Russia) Irbit, Tavda, Orlovsky, Kotelnikovo, Leninsk, Akhtubinsk, Uryupinsk, Alatyr, Krasnoslobodsk, Lebedyan and more locations (Turkey) Sakıp Sabancı Museum, The Museum of Innocence
Friday, March 6, 2015	Bor, Sombor, Bečej, Novi Bečej, Temerin, Zrenjanin, Bačka Palanka, Šid, Smederevska Palanka, Mladenovac, Velika Plana, Aranđelovac, Lazarevac, Valjevo, Kraljevo, Kragujevac and more locations in Serbia; Kharabali and more locations in Russia; Inside views of a Boeing 777 Air France plane at Charles de Gaulle Airport, France.
Tuesday, March 24, 2015	Thasos, Gavrio, Andros, Tinos, Chios, Apollonia, Folegandros, Egina, Gaios, more locations and updates in Greece
Monday, March 30, 2015	Water views for the Danube River in Slovakia, Hungary, Croatia, Serbia, Romania, and Bulgaria
Monday, April 20, 2015	(United Kingdom) Water views on Loch Ness; Landmarks in Gallipoli, Turkey
Tuesday, May 19, 2015	St. Gallen, Ticino, Chur, Locarno, St. Moritz, Bellinzona and several hiking trails in Switzerland
Friday, June 12, 2015	Wrocław–Copernicus Airport, Wrocław Główny railway station, WUWA and views from Sněžka, in Poland; Salina Turda, in Romania
Wednesday, June 17, 2015	Views from Mount Etna in Italy
Thursday, September 3, 2015	Subotica, Sombor, Kikinda, Senta and more location in the north of Serbia; Update and more locations in Portugal
Wednesday, September 16, 2015	More locations and updates in Serbia
Monday, September 28, 2015	Inside views of Airbus A318 at London City Airport in United Kingdom
Tuesday, September 29, 2015	(United Kingdom) Northumberland National Park, including Simonside Hills, Hadrian's Wall and the Pennine Way
Thursday, October 8, 2015	Skopje, Kumanovo, Ohrid, Bitola, Prilep, Veles, Strumica, Tetovo* and more locations in North Macedonia; Dnipro, Zhytomyr, Ternopil, Vinnytsia, Ivano-Frankivsk, Mykolaiv, Kryvyi Rih, Poltava, Chernihiv, Cherkasy, Sumy, Kamianske, Kropyvnytskyi, Khmelnytskyi, Rivne, Kremenchuk, Lutsk, Bila Tserkva, Melitopol*, Nikopol, Uzhhorod, Kamianets-Podilskyi, Oleksandriia, Konotop, Uman, Berdychiv, Shostka, Brovary, Mukachevo, Drohobych, Nizhyn, Novomoskovsk, Sheptytskyi, Pervomaisk, Smila, Kalush, Korosten, Kovel, Pryluky, Stryi, Kolomyia, Zviahel, Enerhodar, Boryspil, Novovolynsk, Lubny, Nova Kakhovka, Fastiv, Horishni Plavni, Romny, Okhtyrka, Svitlovodsk, Marhanets, Shepetivka, Pokrovsk, Voznesensk, Irpin, Vasylkiv, Dubno, Varash, Volodymyr-Volynskyi, Yuzhnoukrainsk, Boryslav, Zhmerynka, Sambir, Boiarka, Hlukhiv, Starokostiantyniv, Vyshneve, Netishyn, Slavuta, Mohyliv-Podilskyi, Obukhiv, Pereiaslav, Truskavets, Kostopil, Znamianka, Khust, Chortkiv, Lebedyn, Bucha, Novyi Rozdil, Sarny, Malyn, Khmilnyk and many more locations and updates in Ukraine
Thursday, October 22, 2015	More locations and updates in Bulgaria
Thursday, October 29, 2015	Landmarks in Pristina, Kosovo, including night views of Mother Tereza Downtown
Wednesday, November 11, 2015	Railways in Portugal
Thursday, November 12, 2015	Landmarks in Kamchatka, Russia; British Museum, in United Kingdom; The Museum of Carriages in Minsk, Belarus
Friday, November 27, 2015	Cluj-Napoca National Theatre, Hungarian Theatre of Cluj, Dormition of the Theotokos Cathedral, Cluj Arena, Cluj-Napoca Botanical Garden, Cluj-Napoca Neolog Synagogue, St. Michael's Church, in Romania; Istanbul Atatürk Airport, in Turkey
Wednesday, December 2, 2015	More locations in Russia
Thursday, December 17, 2015	Ćazim Begova Džamija, in Montenegro; Kyrenia Gate, in Cyprus
Wednesday, January 13, 2016	Miniatur Wunderland in Hamburg, Germany
Thursday, January 21, 2016	/ Mont Blanc in France/Italy; Palace of the Parliament in Bucharest, Romania
Thursday, February 25, 2016	Zaporizhia, Synelnykove, Zhovti Vody in Ukraine
Thursday, March 17, 2016	(United Kingdom) North Downs Way and other walking paths in the UK
Monday, April 25, 2016	Pripyat (Chernobyl Exclusion Zone) in Ukraine
Monday, July 18, 2016	More locations and updates in various existing locations in France (including areas affected by 2016 Nice truck attack); Updates and more locations in: Denmark; Italy; Mexico; Netherlands; Norway; Spain; Sweden; United Kingdom
Saturday, September 3, 2016	Updates and more locations in: France; Italy; Spain; United Kingdom (England and Northern Ireland)
Thursday, November 10, 2016	Tirana, Durrës, Vlorë, Elbasan, Shkodër, Fier, Korçë, Berat, Lushnjë, Pogradec, Kavajë, Gjirokastër in Albania; Podgorica, Nikšić, Pljevlja, Bijelo Polje, Cetinje, Bar, Herceg Novi, Berane, Budva, Ulcinj in Montenegro
Saturday, October 28, 2017	Faroe Islands Malta
Wednesday, July 11, 2018	Major additions in Austria. Minor additions in several countries. See Coverage of Google Street View.
Monday, March 8, 2021	(France) École Polytechnique.
Tuesday, July 25, 2023	Coverage released of most towns, cities, villages, major and rural roads in Germany.
Tuesday, November 4, 2025	Coverage released of most towns, cities, villages, major and rural roads in Bosnia and Herzegovina. Coverage released of most towns, cities, villages, major and rural roads in Cyprus.
Wednesday, June 17, 2026	(Georgia (country)) Coverage released of most towns, cities, villages, major and rural roads in Georgia.
Saturday, July 4, 2026	Updates and more locations in: Albania; Montenegro; North Macedonia; Serbia
Wednesday, July 29, 2026	Coverage released of most towns, cities, villages, major and rural roads in Kosovo.

== Current coverage ==
=== Albania ===
Area
Most towns, cities, villages, major and rural roads

=== Andorra ===
Area
Most towns, cities, villages, major and rural roads

=== Austria ===
Some indoor museum and garden views in Vienna (Volksgarten, Burgtheater, Schönbrunn and more). Ski pistes at the Sölden and Ischgl resorts, Österreichring race track. In general without people in the images.

General streets and roads were published years after most European countries, due to legal issues. In July 2018 images from Vienna, Graz, Klagenfurt, Linz, Wiener Neustadt, Eisenstadt, Baden bei Wien, Villach and Salzburg were published, as well as some roads in Vorarlberg and Tirol and the cc.

On June 18, 2020, Street View published major roads and highways all throughout Austria, in every state.

=== Belarus ===
Area
Historical center of Minsk only.

=== Belgium ===
Area
Most towns, cities, villages, major and rural roads

=== Bosnia and Herzegovina ===
Area
Most towns, cities, villages, major and rural roads

=== Bulgaria ===
Area
Most towns, cities, villages, major and rural roads

=== Croatia ===
Area
Most towns, cities, villages, major roads and some rural roads

=== Cyprus ===
Area
Most towns, cities, villages, major and rural roads.
Northern Cyprus not included.

=== Czech Republic ===
Area
Most towns, cities, villages, major and rural roads

=== Denmark ===
Most towns, cities, villages, major and rural roads. Several small rural roads are missing in Bornholm.

The Faroe Islands has high coverage, including minor roads. Tórshavn, Klaksvík, Hoyvík, Argir, Vágur, Vestmanna, Tvøroyri, Miðvágur, Sørvágur, Toftir, Saltangará, Kollafjørður, Strendur, Sandavágur, Hvalba, Eiði, Sandur, and more locations in the Faroe Islands

Greenland also has some coverage, described in Google Street View in North America.

=== Estonia ===
Area
Most towns, cities, villages, major and rural roads

=== Finland ===
Area
Most towns, cities, villages, major and rural roads

=== France ===
Area
Most towns, cities, villages, major and rural roads.
Some overseas areas have coverage. See Google Street View in Africa, North America and Oceania.

=== Georgia ===
Area
Most towns, cities, villages, as well as some major and rural roads.
Abkhazia, Akhalkalaki, South Ossetia not included.

=== Germany ===
Most towns, cities, villages, major and rural roads

Due to legal and other issues, coverage was previously mostly restricted to major cities. However, on June 8, 2023, Google announced that Google Street View was returning to Germany, and soon released extensive official coverage.

In July 2023, Google resumed and expanded Street View coverage in Germany after a 12-year pause, adding refreshed imagery of cities such as Berlin, Hamburg, and Munich. The rollout included privacy enhancements like automatic blurring of faces and license plates, while retaining the option for residents to request additional blurring of private property.

=== Greece ===
Area
Most towns, cities, villages, major and rural roads

=== Hungary ===
Area
Most towns, cities, villages, major and rural roads

=== Iceland ===
Area
Most towns, cities, villages, major and rural roads

=== Ireland ===
Area
Most towns, cities, villages, major and rural roads

=== Italy ===
Area
Most towns, cities, villages, major and rural roads

=== Kosovo ===
Area
Most towns, cities, villages, major and rural roads

=== Latvia ===
Area
Most towns, cities, villages, major and rural roads, and tripods in Riga

=== Liechtenstein ===
Area
Most towns, cities, villages, major and rural roads

=== Lithuania ===
Most towns, cities, villages, major and rural roads, and well as trekkers and tripods in Vilnius, Kaunas, Kernave, Klaipėda and Palanga.

=== Luxembourg ===
Area
Most towns, cities, villages, major and rural roads

=== Malta ===
Area
Most towns, cities, villages, major and rural roads

=== Monaco ===
Area
Most major, minor roads

=== Montenegro ===
Area
Most towns, cities, villages, major and rural roads

=== Netherlands ===
Area
Most towns, cities, villages, major and rural roads

=== North Macedonia ===
Area
Most towns, cities, villages, major and rural roads

=== Norway ===
Area
Most towns, cities, villages, major and rural roads
No coverage in Jan Mayen, only coverage of waters around Svalbard

=== Poland ===
Area
Most towns, cities, villages, major and rural roads

=== Portugal ===
Area
Most towns, cities, villages, major and rural roads
This includes the main islands of Madeira and Azores.

=== Romania ===
Area
Most towns, cities, villages, major and rural roads

=== Russia ===
Federal District	Major cities/subjects/areas covered
	European Russia
Central	Belgorod Oblast (mostly full coverage), Bryansk Oblast (mostly full coverage), Vladimir Oblast (limited coverage), Voronezh Oblast (limited coverage by Google; big coverage by not official Google imagery within a radius of 150 km from Voronezh, including administrative centres of several districts), Ivanovo Oblast (mostly full coverage), Kaluga Oblast (limited coverage), Kostroma Oblast (Kostroma and roads in and out of Kostroma only), Kursk Oblast (Kursk, administrative centres of some districts and connecting roads only), Lipetsk Oblast (Yelets, Lipetsk, and connecting roads only), Moscow (Full coverage), Moscow Oblast (mostly full coverage), Oryol Oblast (Oryol, Livny, and connecting roads only), Ryazan Oblast (Ryazan and connecting roads only), Smolensk Oblast (Smolensk, Roslavl, Vyazma, and connecting roads only), Tambov Oblast (Tambov, Michurinsk, and connecting roads only), Tver Oblast (Tver, Torzhok, Staritsa, and connecting roads only), Tula Oblast (mostly full coverage), Yaroslavl Oblast (mostly full coverage)
North Caucasian	Dagestan Republic (limited coverage), Ingushetia Republic (extremely limited coverage), Kabardino-Balkar Republic (extremely limited coverage), Karachay-Cherkessia Republic (limited coverage), North Ossetia-Alania Republic (limited coverage), Stavropol Krai (Stavropol, Pyatigorsk, Essentuki, Kislovodsk, and connecting roads only), Chechen Republic (limited coverage)
Northwestern	Arkhangelsk Oblast (Arkhangelsk and connecting roads only), Vologda Oblast (Cherepovets, Vologda, and connecting roads only), Kaliningrad Oblast (mostly full coverage), Karelia Republic (limited coverage), Komi Republic (limited coverage, with views in Vorkuta), Leningrad Oblast (mostly full coverage), Murmansk Oblast (limited coverage), Nenets Autonomous Okrug (extremely limited coverage), Novgorod Oblast (limited coverage), Pskov Oblast (limited coverage), Saint Petersburg (full coverage)
Southern	Adygea Republic (mostly full coverage), Astrakhan Oblast (Astrakhan and connecting roads only), Volgograd Oblast (Volgograd and connecting roads only), Kalmykia Republic (Elista and connecting roads only), Krasnodar Krai (mostly full coverage), Rostov Oblast (limited coverage)
Volga	Bashkortostan Republic (limited coverage), Kirov Oblast (extremely limited coverage by Google; mostly full coverage by not official Google imagery), Mari-El Republic (Yoshkar-Ola and connecting roads only), Mordovia Republic (Saransk and Krasnoslobodsk only), Nizhny Novgorod Oblast (limited coverage), Orenburg Oblast (Orsk, Novotroitsk, and Orenburg only), Penza Oblast (Penza and connecting roads only), Perm Krai (Perm and connecting roads only), Samara Oblast (limited coverage), Saratov Oblast (limited coverage), Tatarstan Republic (limited coverage), Udmurt Republic (Votkinsk, Izhevsk, Glazov, Sarapul, Mozhga and connecting roads only), Ulyanovsk Oblast (Dimitrovgrad, Ulyanovsk, and connecting roads only), Chuvash Republic (Cheboksary and connecting roads only)
Other	Siberia and Far East
Far Eastern	Amur Oblast (Blagoveshchensk and connecting roads only), Jewish Autonomous Oblast (Birobidzhan and connecting roads only), Kamchatka Krai (Petropavlovsk-Kamchatsky, Yelizovo, Paratunka, Milkovo, Esso, Klyuchi, and connecting roads only), Magadan Oblast (Magadan and connecting roads only), Primorsky Krai (mostly full coverage), Sakha Republic (Yakutsk, Neryungri and connecting roads only), Sakhalin Oblast (mostly full coverage), Khabarovsk Krai (Khabarovsk, Komsomolsk-on-Amur, and connecting roads), Chukotka Autonomous Okrug (no coverage)
Siberian	Altai Republic (extremely limited coverage), Altai Krai (Rubtsovsk, Barnaul, and connecting roads), Buryatia Republic (mostly full coverage), Zabaykalsky Krai (extremely limited coverage), Irkutsk Oblast (limited coverage), Kemerovo Oblast (limited coverage), Krasnoyarsk Krai (limited coverage), Novosibirsk Oblast (Novosibirsk, Tatarsk, Barabinsk, and connecting roads only), Omsk Oblast (mostly full coverage), Tomsk Oblast (Tomsk and connecting roads only), Tuva Republic (extremely limited coverage), Khakassia Republic (extremely limited coverage)
Ural	Kurgan Oblast (Kurgan and connecting roads only), Sverdlovsk Oblast (limited coverage), Tyumen Oblast (limited coverage), Khanty-Mansi Autonomous Okrug (mostly full coverage), Chelyabinsk Oblast (mostly full coverage), Yamalo-Nenets Autonomous Okrug (limited coverage)

For other part of Russia, can see Google Street View in Asia

=== San Marino ===
Area
Most towns, cities, villages, major and rural roads

=== Serbia ===
Area
Most towns, cities, villages, major and rural roads

=== Slovakia ===
Area
Most towns, cities, villages, major and rural roads

=== Slovenia ===
Area
Most towns, cities, villages, major and rural roads

.

=== Spain ===
Most towns, cities, villages, major and rural roads. This includes the Balearic Islands and the Canary Islands.

Ceuta and Melilla have some coverage.

=== Sweden ===
Area
Most towns, cities, villages, major and rural roads

=== Turkey ===
Area
Most towns, cities, villages, major and rural roads

In many other part of Turkey, can see Google Street View in Asia

=== Switzerland ===
Most towns, cities, villages, major and rural roads. Many small gaps in residential areas.

=== Ukraine ===
Area
Most towns, cities, major roads, some villages and rural roads.

Excluding the part of Russian occupied territories and southern Odesa.

=== United Kingdom ===
Most towns, cities, villages, major and rural roads, including Jersey, the Isle of Man and some of Gibraltar.

However, many rural and suburban areas have not been updated since 2009/10.

For overseas territories, see articles about other continents.

== Future coverage ==
Below is a list of the countries that do not currently have official coverage where Street View vehicles are currently driving, where Street View is officially planned, or have reported by media to be driving.

- Moldova (public streets)

== Controversy ==
Street View has been controversial in different countries for various reasons.

In September 2010, the Czech Republic banned any further capturing of Street View images. This occurred after more than half a year of unsuccessful negotiation between the Czech Republic and Google. However, on June 24, 2011, the cars started driving again, with the camera holder lowered by 30 cm (12 in) for privacy reasons.

In November 2010, a British watchdog group said that Google broke the law by obtaining personal data from people. The British government said the company would not be fined for the breach.

In March 2011, legal action against Google Street View in Germany resulted in court ruling that the project is legal; however, Google later decided not to expand or update existing coverage of Germany by the service.

In April 2011, a temporary ban on Google Street View data collecting in Austria was lifted, after being imposed by national data protection agency in May 2010. Google announced it was satisfied with the decision, but also stated that it had no plans to offer Google Street View coverage in Austria in the foreseeable future. In July 2018 general street coverage was introduced in Austria.

In April 2013, Google was fined €145,000 for illegally recording information from unsecured wireless networks in Germany.

There is some criticism of privacy concerns as well.
