= Taldysay =

- Town
- Location in Kazakhstan
- Coordinates: 50°09′36″N 55°39′00″E
- Country: Kazakhstan
- Region: Aktobe Region
- District: Kobda District
- Time zone: UTC+5 (Central Asia Time)

Taldysay (Kazakh: Талдысай, Taldysai) is a small town in Kobda District in Aktobe Region of western Kazakhstan. It lies along the R-76 road, west of Komsomol'skoe.

A preserved mausoleum, made of burnt bricks with a conical dome, is located 2 kilometres (1.2 mi) south of the town.
