= Temirbek Zhurgenov, Kazakhstan =

Temirbek Zhurgenov
- Town
- Location in Kazakhstan
- Coordinates: 50°25′43″N 60°30′20″E
- Country: Kazakhstan
- Region: Aktobe Region
- District: Kobda District
- Time zone: UTC+5 (Central Asia Time)

Temirbek Zhurgenov (Kazakh: Темірбек Жүргенов, Temırbek Jürgenov) is a town in Kobda District in the Aktobe Region of western Kazakhstan. It was known as Komsomolskoye (Kazakh: Комсомол, Komsomol) before 2020. It lies along the R-76 road which connects it to Taldysay in the west.

== Climate ==
Climate data for Temirbek Zhurgenov (1991–2020)
| Month | Jan | Feb | Mar | Apr | May | Jun | Jul | Aug | Sep | Oct | Nov | Dec | Year |
|---|---|---|---|---|---|---|---|---|---|---|---|---|---|
| Mean daily maximum °C (°F) | −10.7 (12.7) | −9.6 (14.7) | −2.3 (27.9) | 12.3 (54.1) | 22.0 (71.6) | 27.8 (82.0) | 29.1 (84.4) | 28.1 (82.6) | 21.1 (70.0) | 11.9 (53.4) | −0.5 (31.1) | −8.0 (17.6) | 10.1 (50.2) |
| Daily mean °C (°F) | −14.6 (5.7) | −14.1 (6.6) | −6.8 (19.8) | 6.2 (43.2) | 14.9 (58.8) | 20.6 (69.1) | 22.2 (72.0) | 20.7 (69.3) | 13.5 (56.3) | 5.2 (41.4) | −4.5 (23.9) | −11.8 (10.8) | 4.3 (39.7) |
| Mean daily minimum °C (°F) | −18.6 (−1.5) | −18.2 (−0.8) | −11.0 (12.2) | 0.8 (33.4) | 7.9 (46.2) | 13.3 (55.9) | 15.6 (60.1) | 13.7 (56.7) | 7.0 (44.6) | −0.1 (31.8) | −8.0 (17.6) | −15.7 (3.7) | −1.1 (30.0) |
| Average precipitation mm (inches) | 14.8 (0.58) | 13.0 (0.51) | 19.9 (0.78) | 22.1 (0.87) | 28.3 (1.11) | 23.1 (0.91) | 31.4 (1.24) | 22.0 (0.87) | 13.2 (0.52) | 21.7 (0.85) | 19.9 (0.78) | 19.9 (0.78) | 249.3 (9.81) |
| Average precipitation days (≥ 1.0 mm) | 4.7 | 3.9 | 4.3 | 4.4 | 4.8 | 4.2 | 4.5 | 3.4 | 2.6 | 4.3 | 5.1 | 5.8 | 52 |
Source: NOAA
