= Kobda =

- aul
- Location in Kazakhstan
- Coordinates: 50°09′36″N 55°39′00″E
- Country: Kazakhstan
- Region: Aktobe Region
- District: Kobda District

Kobda (Kazakh: Қобда ауданы, Qobda aýdany) is an aul and the administrative center of Kobda district of Aktobe Region in Kazakhstan. Kobda is on the Kobda River.

== Climate ==
Kobda has a humid continental climate (Köppen: Dfa), with hot summers and very cold winters.

Climate data for Kobda (1991–2020)
Month	Jan	Feb	Mar	Apr	May	Jun	Jul	Aug	Sep	Oct	Nov	Dec	Year
Mean daily maximum °C (°F)	−8.0 (17.6)	−6.9 (19.6)	0.4 (32.7)	14.5 (58.1)	23.2 (73.8)	28.5 (83.3)	30.3 (86.5)	29.2 (84.6)	22.0 (71.6)	12.8 (55.0)	1.4 (34.5)	−5.5 (22.1)	11.8 (53.2)
Daily mean °C (°F)	−11.8 (10.8)	−11.3 (11.7)	−4.0 (24.8)	8.2 (46.8)	16.2 (61.2)	21.6 (70.9)	23.5 (74.3)	21.9 (71.4)	14.7 (58.5)	6.5 (43.7)	−2.5 (27.5)	−9.1 (15.6)	6.2 (43.2)
Mean daily minimum °C (°F)	−15.6 (3.9)	−15.3 (4.5)	−7.9 (17.8)	2.7 (36.9)	9.5 (49.1)	14.6 (58.3)	16.6 (61.9)	14.9 (58.8)	8.2 (46.8)	1.3 (34.3)	−5.7 (21.7)	−12.6 (9.3)	0.9 (33.6)
Average precipitation mm (inches)	22.8 (0.90)	19.6 (0.77)	23.5 (0.93)	23.0 (0.91)	26.9 (1.06)	32.1 (1.26)	25.7 (1.01)	18.0 (0.71)	17.3 (0.68)	27.1 (1.07)	26.5 (1.04)	26.7 (1.05)	289.1 (11.38)
Average precipitation days (≥ 1.0 mm)	6.5	5.3	4.9	4.4	4.6	4.4	3.8	3.2	3.4	4.8	6.0	7.1	58.4
Source: NOAA
