= Google Street View in North America =

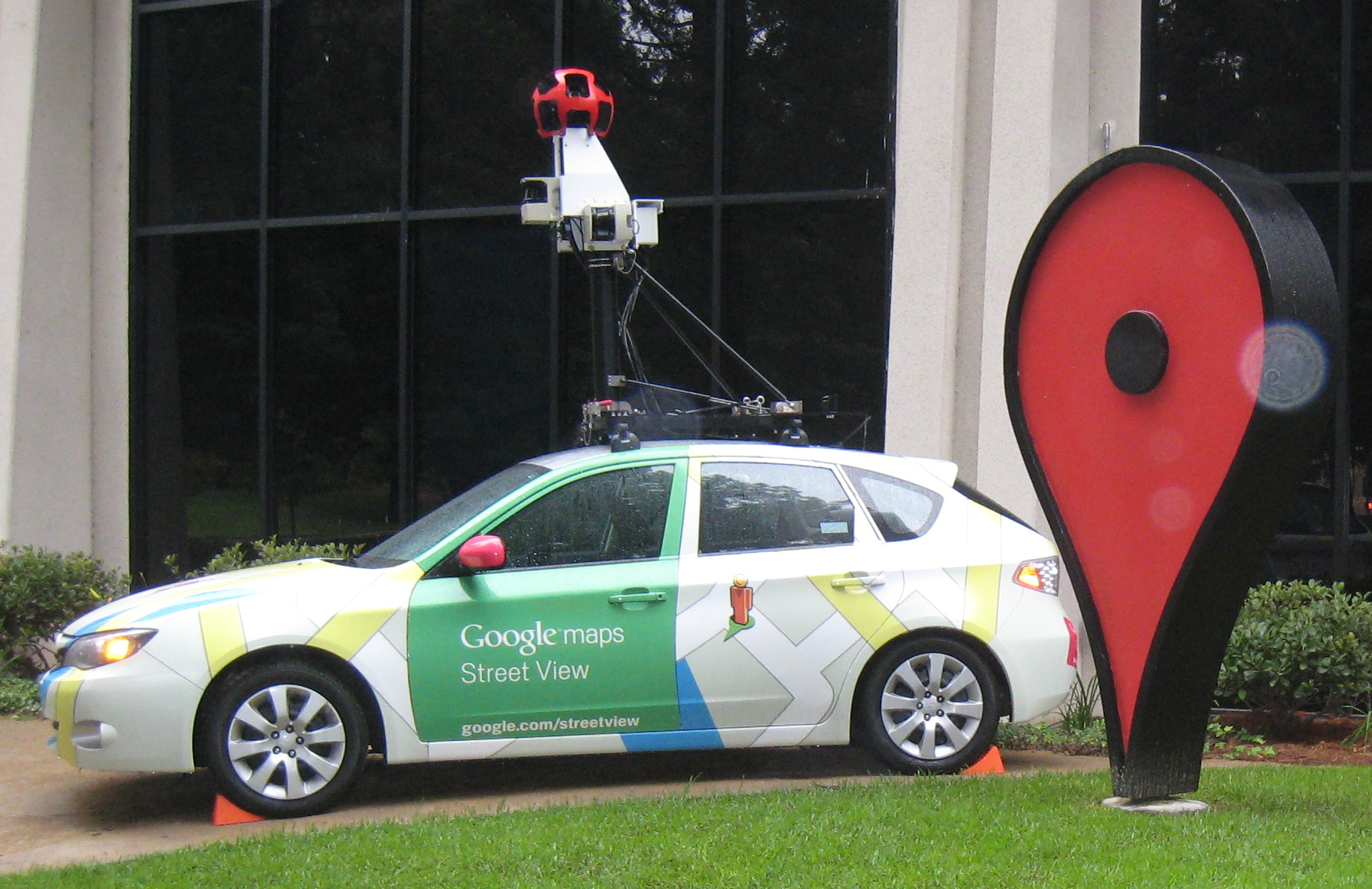
Taken in October 2010, a Google Maps Camera Car showcased on Google campus in Mountain View, California

In North America, Google Street View is available in Canada, the United States, Mexico, Guatemala, the Dominican Republic, Greenland, and limited coverage in some more areas.

== Background ==
=== United States ===
The United States was the first country to have Google Street View images and was the only country with images for over a year following introduction of the service on May 25, 2007. Early on, most locations had a limited number of views, usually constrained to the city limits and only including major streets, and they only showed the buildings up to a certain height. Few suburbs or other nearby cities were included.

After the first few sets of introductions, image collections from cities added were more detailed, often including every side street, especially in areas closer to the center of the city. More suburbs and other nearby cities were included.

The coverage of various cities has in many cases, subsequently been enlarged and improved, but not necessarily on the same date as new cities have been added. Improvements have included the additions of streets in neighborhoods where previously only main roads had been covered, expansions to more suburbs, and views to the sky where previously only views to a certain height were provided.

Initially when a group of cities were added, only those cities and their own suburbs would be a part of the image collection. However June 10, 2008 introductions also included cities in covered areas without camera icons and isolated from any other camera icons. Many more cities were added without icons on August 4, when the only U.S. city added with an icon was New Orleans.

On November 9, 2009, parts of Hawaii were added, and coverage of the United States was also further expanded, although some key areas had yet to be added. With the addition of Hawaii, all fifty states are now represented in Street View.

On July 2, 2013, high-definition images, at least 99% of which have been taken since early 2011, were added to major portions of all fifty states, including those that have had no HD images up to that point.

The last state or territory of the US to get coverage was Puerto Rico on December 14, 2016.

=== Canada ===
Street View in Canada began on October 7, 2009. On this day, Street View was made available for several large Canadian cities, as well as Banff National Park and Whistler, British Columbia (one of the sites from the 2010 Winter Olympics). This was after long anticipation of the feature in the country. Street View cars had been spotted as early as 2007.

On December 2, 2009, nine more Canadian cities were added, from east to west St. John's, Sherbrooke, Sudbury, London, Winnipeg, Saskatoon, Edmonton and Victoria.

On February 10, 2010, many more areas of Canada (barring extremely northern and rural areas) were added. Of note, ski runs on Whistler Blackcomb Resort is also covered in this update. As of 2013 the northernmost community imaged is the Arctic island community of Cambridge Bay, Nunavut. As of April 2014 the only Canadian urban areas whose images have not been uploaded are the urban areas within the Labrador region of Newfoundland and Labrador.

On October 10, 2012, street view images in many parts of Canada were updated and some new images of parks, trails, university campuses and zoos were added.

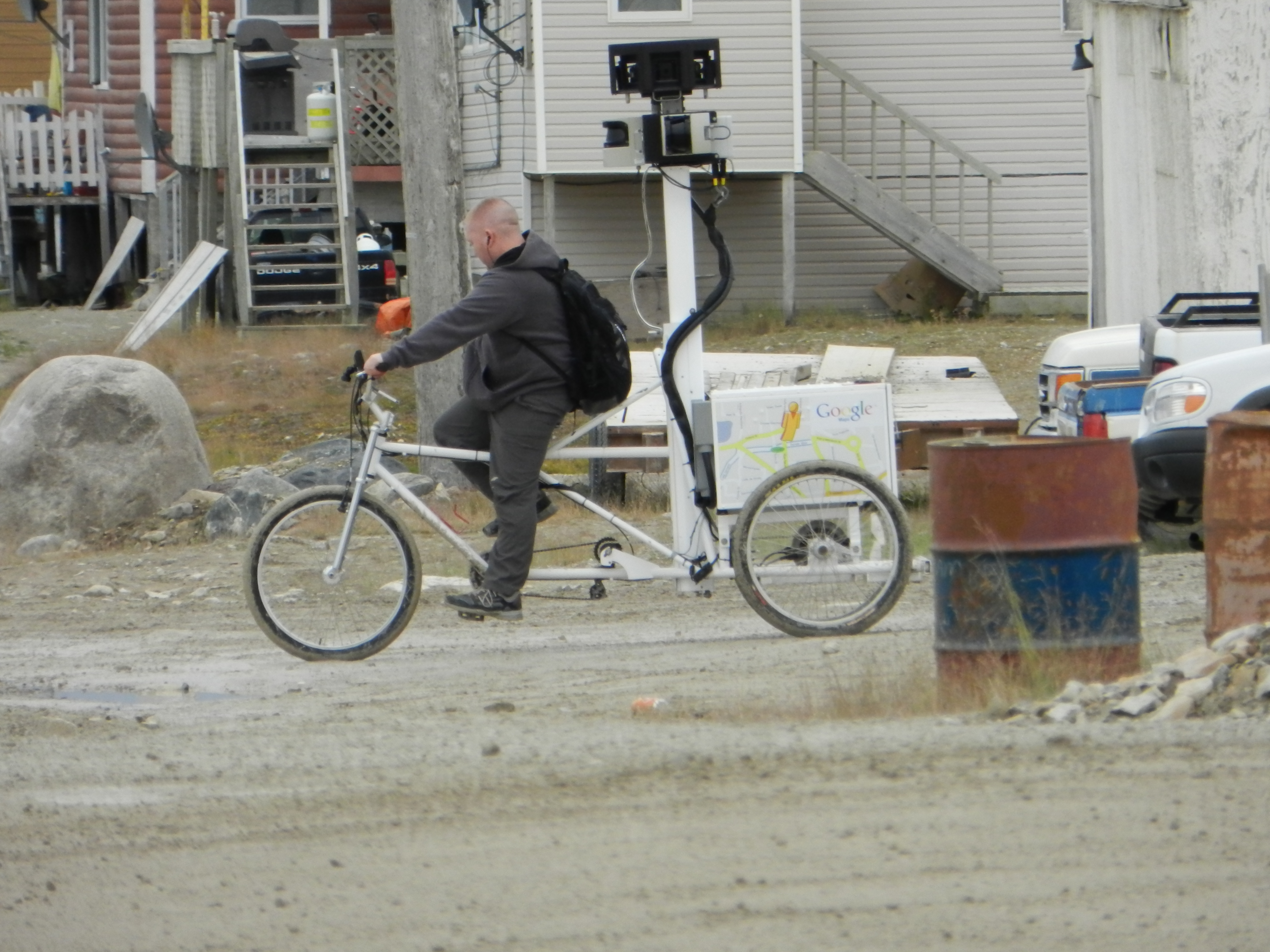
Google Trike in Cambridge Bay, Nunavut, August 23, 2012

On March 19, 2013, the Nunavut city of Iqaluit was imaged. Rather than shipping a car or using a trike the city will be imaged using backpack mounted cameras over a period of three days. One of the people involved, Chris Kalluk, was responsible for Google mapping Cambridge Bay, his home town. Iqaluit officially appeared on Street View on July 9, 2013, coinciding with Nunavut Day. With the inclusion of Iqaluit all provincial/territorial capitals have been imaged and are available on Street View.

In 2013, Parks Canada began a 2-year collaboration with Google to provide street view images of the most iconic parks and heritage places in Canada. In November 2013, the first set of images were released.

In 2014, Street View imagery of Fort McMurray was uploaded. The northern Alberta city was the last remaining major Canadian urban area to be imaged. However, as of July 2015, Street View imagery has yet to be uploaded for any communities in Labrador.

=== Mexico ===
In Mexico, the first reports of sightings came in from Tijuana in July 2007 making it the first city in Latin America and now Google Street View cars are being spotted in many Mexican states. On November 9, 2009, Street View was made available in cities of Mexico, including Mexico City, Guadalajara, Monterrey, Puebla, Cancún and Puerto Vallarta.

On February 10, 2010, more places were added.

On April 15, 2010, more areas of Mexico were uploaded. Although complete coverage has not yet occurred (in some cities only main streets are imaged), numerous locations including communities in Baja California and Ciudad Juárez now had extensive street-level coverage with this update.

In August 2012, panoramic views of 30 Mesoamerican archaeological sites were added.

Filming of Street View in Mexico began in October 2008.

=== Central America ===
Guatemala was added on April 25, 2017.

Some landmarks in Costa Rica were added on July 17, 2018.

Costa Rica was added on August 26, 2025.

=== Caribbean ===
Martinique was added on December 11, 2013, using backpack mounted cameras.

Bermuda was added in 2015 and U.S. Virgin Islands and Puerto Rico were added in 2016

Curaçao was added in 2018

Dominican Republic was added in 2019

=== North Atlantic islands ===
Selected parts of Greenland were added on February 18, 2015. They cover some villages and some boat trips. Greenland has no roads between villages. The images were taken from boats, cars, all-terrain vehicles, hiking backpacks and more modes.

Bermuda was added in 2015, in May underwater views outside the island, in September locations on land.

Saint Pierre and Miquelon was added on May 17, 2017.

== Areas included ==
=== Bermuda ===
Most towns, cities, villages, major and rural roads & landmarks including Fort St. Catherine, St. David's Lighthouse, Bermuda National Sports Centre, Bermuda Botanical Gardens, Admiralty House Park, Bermuda Railway Trail, Clearwater Beach & more landmarks.

=== Canada ===
Most towns, cities, villages, major and rural roads are covered in Canada.

=== Costa Rica ===
Most towns, cities, villages, major and rural roads & landmarks including Institute of Technology, Isla del Coco, Juan Santamaría International Airport, Museo Nacional de Costa Rica, Playa Grande, and more. Some streets of Heredia.

=== Curaçao ===
Most towns, cities, villages, major and rural roads are covered.

=== Dominican Republic ===
- Santo Domingo and most surrounding municipalities
- Santiago de los Caballeros
- Punta Cana
- Boca Chica
- Nagua

=== Martinique ===
Landmark coverage including Jardin de Balata & Habitation Clément.

=== Guatemala ===
Most towns, cities, villages, major and rural roads.

=== Greenland ===
Municipality	Major cities/areas
Avannaata	Ilimanaq, Ilulissat, Oqaatsut, Qaanaaq, Qeqertaq, Saqqaq, Siorapaluk, Uummannaq
Kujalleq	Narsaq, Narsarsuaq, Qaqortoq, Qassiarsuk
Northeast Greenland	Daneborg
Qeqertalik	Aasiaat, Akunnaaq, Ikamiut, Ikerasaarsuk, Ilulissat, Niaqornaarsuk, Qasigiannguit, Qeqertarsuaq
Qeqqata	Itilleq, Kangerlussuaq, Maniitsoq, Sarfannguit, Sisimiut; A road between Kangerlussuaq and the ice sheet. A snow mobile ride between Sisimiut and Kangerlussuaq.
Sermersooq (west)	Nuuk, Paamiut
Sermersooq (east)	Ittoqqortoormiit, Kulusuk, Tasiilaq

and more locations and water views

=== Mexico ===
State	Major cities/areas
Aguascalientes	Aguascalientes, Arteaga
Baja California	Tijuana (All Metropolitan Area and vicinity), Ensenada, Mexicali, Playas de Rosarito, Tecate, San Felipe, Algodones, Batáquez, Lázaro Cárdenas, La Misión, Cataviña, Vicente Guerrero, Valle de Guadalupe, Santa Isabel, El Sauzal, Guadalupe Victoria, San Quintin, La Salina, Rosario, La Mesa, Mesa de Otay.
Baja California Sur	La Paz, San José del Cabo, Cabo San Lucas, Loreto, Guerrero Negro, Santa Rosalía, Mulegé, Ciudad Insurgentes, Ciudad Constitucion, Todos Santos
Campeche	Campeche, Ciudad del Carmen
Chiapas	Tuxtla Gutierrez, San Cristóbal, Comitán, Tapachula
(Chihuahua (state)) Chihuahua	Chihuahua, Ciudad Juárez, Ojinaga, Casas Grandes, Delicias, Hidalgo del Parral, Cuauhtemoc
Coahuila	Saltillo, Monclova, Torreón, Piedras Negras, Ciudad Acuña, Ramos Arizpe
Colima	Colima, Manzanillo, Tecoman
(Mexico City) Distrito Federal	Distrito Federal (All Metropolitan Area and vicinity)
Durango	Durango, Gómez Palacio
Guerrero	Chilpancingo, Acapulco, Iguala, Zihuatanejo,
Guanajuato	Leon, Silao, Irapuato, Celaya, Salamanca, Salvatierra, Acámbaro, San Francisco del Rincon, Dolores Hidalgo, San Miguel de Allende, Guanajuato, Juventino Rosas
(Hidalgo (state)) Hidalgo	Pachuca, Tula, Tepeji
Jalisco	Guadalajara (All Metropolitan Area and vicinity), Puerto Vallarta, Zapopan, Tlaquepaque, Ciudad Guzmán, Tepatitlan, Lagos de Moreno, Ocotlan, La Barca, Chapala, Ameca, Tala
(State of Mexico) Mexico	Toluca, Cuautitlán, Ecatepec de Morelos, Naucalpan, Metepec
Michoacán	Morelia, Lázaro Cárdenas, Apatzingan, Uruapan, Zitacuaro, Zacapu, La Piedad, Zamora, Sahuayo
Morelos	Cuernavaca, Cuautla, Temixco
Nayarit	Tepic, Ixtlan del Rio, Compostela, Las Varas, Xalisco, Tuxpan, San Blas
Nuevo León	Monterrey (All Metropolitan Area and vicinity)
Oaxaca	Oaxaca, Tuxtepec, Salina Cruz
Puebla	Puebla de Zaragoza, Atlixco, Tehuacan
Querétaro	Querétaro, San Juan del Río, Tequisquiapan
Quintana Roo	Cancún, Playa del Carmen, Cozumel (Riviera Maya), Tulum, Chetumal, Felipe Carrillo Puerto, Isla Mujeres
San Luis Potosí	San Luis Potosí, Matehuala, Ciudad Valles, Rioverde
Sinaloa	Culiacán, Escuinapa, Guamuchil, Guasave, Mazatlán, Los Mochis
Sonora	Hermosillo, Ciudad Obregón, Nogales, San Luis Rio Colorado, Caborca, Navojoa, Cananea, Agua Prieta, Guaymas, Empalme
Tabasco	Villahermosa, Cardenas
Tamaulipas	Nuevo Laredo, Reynosa, Ciudad Victoria, Matamoros, Tampico, Ciudad Mante, Madero
Tlaxcala	Tlaxcala
Veracruz	Veracruz, Coatzacoalcos, Minatitlan, Boca del Rio, Tuxtla, Cordova, Xalapa, Poza Rica, Tuxpan
Yucatán	Mérida, Celestun, Progreso, Valladolid, Ticul, Oxkutzcab
Zacatecas	Zacatecas, Sombrerete, Guadalupe, Jerez, Fresnillo, Valparaíso, Nochistlan

=== Saint Pierre and Miquelon ===
Landmark coverage including Ile aux Marins & hiking trails on Saint Pierre Island

=== Panama ===
Most towns, cities, villages, major and rural roads (except Comarca indigenas and areas near the Darien Gap).

=== Puerto Rico ===
Most towns, cities, villages, major and rural roads.

=== United States ===
Most towns, cities, villages, major and rural roads.

=== United States Virgin Islands ===
Most towns, cities, villages, major and rural roads.

== Countries without any coverage ==
Central America:

- Belize
- Honduras
- Nicaragua

Caribbean:

- Bahamas
- Cuba
- Dominica
- Grenada
- Haiti
- Jamaica
- Saint Kitts and Nevis
- Saint Lucia
- Saint Vincent and the Grenadines
- Trinidad and Tobago
- Aruba: All these countries have user-generated panorama photos called Photo Spheres, similar to the Street View photos, accessible within Google Maps.

=== Unofficial coverage ===
Martinique: In 2021, unofficial street view was added in Martinique by the island's tourism council.

Antigua and Barbuda: in 2024, only Caribbean country with full coverage.
