= Google Street View privacy concerns =

Privacy advocates have objected to the Google Street View feature, pointing to photographs that show people leaving strip clubs, protesters at an abortion clinic, sunbathers in bikinis, cottagers at public parks, people picking up prostitutes, and people engaging in activities visible from public property which they do not wish to be photographed and have published online. Google maintains that the photos were taken from public property. However, this does not take into account that the Street View cameras take pictures from an elevated position, enabling them to look over hedges and walls designed to prevent some areas from being open to public view.

Google Street View blurs parts of images containing car number plates and human faces in order to protect privacy and anonymity. Before launching the service, Google removed photos of domestic violence shelters, and additionally allows users to flag inappropriate or sensitive imagery for Google to review and remove. When the service was first launched, the process for requesting that an image be removed was not trivial. Google changed its policy to make removal more straightforward, but has since removed the option to request removal of an image, replacing it by an option to request blurring of an image. Images of potential break-ins, sunbathers, and individuals entering adult bookstores have, however, remained active and these images have been widely republished.

Google Street View in Europe may not be legal in all jurisdictions. Some European countries have laws prohibiting the filming without consent of an individual on public property for the purpose of public display.

Concerns about Google Street View are part of privacy concerns with Google and criticism of Google.

== Americas ==
=== Argentina ===
In Argentina, Street View cars started taking pictures four years later than originally planned. Initially, Google planned to start collecting images on the same day as in Brazil but they didn't get government permits. These permits were obtained in September 2013. One day after Google Street View cars started taking pictures, a lawyer from La Plata tried to stop them in his city but on October 4, 2013, a justice dismissed his complaint.

=== Canada ===
While Canada, like other jurisdictions, has raised the issue of privacy concerns regarding Google Street View, the presence of Google cameras in one Canadian city in March 2009 gave rise to a different complaint. Les MacPherson, a columnist with the Saskatoon Star-Phoenix, complained in a March 28, 2009, column that the timing of the imaging, at the end of a protracted winter season and before the true onset of spring would cast an unfavourable image of Saskatoon and other cities. In early October 2009, the first Canadian cities began to appear on Street View; several, including Saskatoon, were not included in the initial roll-out. One city that was included, Calgary, included images taken in both summer and winter. Images of Saskatoon were rolled out on December 2, 2009.

=== United States ===
Google delayed the release of Street View of the Baltimore-Washington Metropolitan Area following concern expressed by the United States Department of Homeland Security that some of the images taken might be of security-sensitive areas. Additionally, the Department of Defense has banned Google from publishing Street View content of U.S. Military bases and asked Google to remove existing content of bases. Google has complied with this order.

Some cities in the United States where all streets are privately owned have asked Google to remove Street View images because their consent was not given. North Oaks, Minnesota may have been the first. In that case, Google complied.

Aaron and Christine Boring, a Pittsburgh couple, sued Google for invasion of privacy. Street View made a photo of their home available online, and they claimed that this diminished the value of their house, which they had chosen for its privacy. They lost their case in a Pennsylvania court. "While it is easy to imagine that many whose property appears on Google's virtual maps resent the privacy implications, it is hard to believe that any – other than the most exquisitely sensitive – would suffer shame or humiliation," Judge Hay ruled. Since then the decision was reversed in part and on December 1, 2010, Magistrate Judge Bissoon ruled that Google is an intentional trespasser and the company was ordered to pay one US dollar to the plaintiffs.

In September 2007, a Street View vehicle took a picture of a house on fire in Gibson, Arkansas. In August 2008, the people who lived in the house asked Google to remove this picture.

In 2010, the Electronic Privacy Information Center (EPIC) filed a complaint with the Federal Trade Commission (FTC) stating that Google's admitted downloading of private Wi-Fi data constituted a violation of The US Wiretap Act and The Federal Communications Act. The FTC decided not to take up the complaint. Documents subsequently obtained by EPIC under Freedom of Information Act (FOIA) indicated, despite a request from Congress, that the FTC did not examine Google's data from private wireless networks before dropping the case. EPIC filed an administrative appeal with the FTC, challenging its decision, and in May 2011 EPIC filed a suit against the FTC for access to the documents on which the FTC's decision was based.

== Asia ==
=== Hong Kong ===
Before the launch of Google Street View in Hong Kong, the Hong Kong Privacy Commissioner for Personal Data took the initiative to inquire into the Google Street View project, to ensure that it complies with the provisions of the Personal Data (Privacy) Ordinance in Hong Kong and to consider privacy issues that may arise.

Google declares that the Project does not intend to compile information about specific individuals whose identities can be ascertained. Faces of passers-by and car licence plates in the photographs will be unidentifiable because blurring technology is to be used. Also, there will be at least a three-month gap between image gathering and publication, to prevent the images being used to identify an individual's current whereabouts.

Google also assures the Commissioner that if anyone objects to any image of themselves, their cars, houses or children captured by the cameras, the related image will be removed.

The commissioner concluded that Google Street View does not breach Hong Kong privacy laws. But he will look seriously into any complaint made by an affected individual in accordance with the Personal Data (Privacy) Ordinance.

=== India ===
Google started taking Street View images in Bangalore, India, on May 26, 2011. A Google executive promised that they would do their best to avoid security concerns. However, on June 20, 2011, Street View was blocked in Bangalore due to security concerns from the police in Bangalore. Google officials and leaders from BJP, the ruling party in Karnataka, organized a meeting on July 19, 2011, to allow Street View in Bangalore. The Google officials, however, failed to convince the leaders that they would not violate any privacy laws.

However, on 27 July 2022 the government of India allowed Street View in some cities of India like Chennai, New Delhi, Mumbai, and many others.

=== Japan ===
In Japan, Google Street View started in August 2008 and was made available for ten Japanese Prefectures in February 2009. The available Street View areas depicted residential and business areas, and showed the faces of pedestrians, displayed vehicle registration plates, and the name plate of a family residence (表札, hyōsatsu) – Google's decision to show these has led to disputes. Local governments, lawyers and individuals claimed Google was violating privacy. On February 3, 2009, Google Japan representatives attended a meeting about privacy concerns held at a Tokyo Metropolitan Government facility, and agreed that privacy issues had not been adequately considered. Google pledged that, before taking photographs for Street View, they would in future notify the provinces' local government. Google Japan admitted that notifications and explanations of this kind had already been taking place in countries other than Japan, but had not done so in Japan as they were not aware of the potential privacy concerns.

On May 13, 2009, Google Japan announced that it would modify its cameras to scan from a lower height of 2.05 meters (6 ft 9 in) above ground level, 95 centimeters (37 in) lower than the original height of the camera head. The new height is intended to avoid having cameras view over fences in front of homes and into homes. This reduced height is to be applied immediately, and all areas previously visited will be retaken from the reduced height. Imagery taken at the original height remained available until they are replaced with the new images.

On November 11, 2011, the Ministry of Internal Affairs and Communications issued an administrative guidance to Google Inc. that its collection of Wi-Fi data was against the law of telecommunication which requests secrecy of communication, and requested to delete the recorded data, to take measures of preventing of recording the communication data, and to let it be known publicly in Japanese.

=== Philippines ===
The administration of the University of the Philippines Diliman expressed concern in 2019 about a breach of privacy due to the capture of Street View imagery in the vicinity of their campus. They cited similar concerns raised in Germany, India, Japan, the United Kingdom, and the United States. The university's data protection officer recommended that Google not be permitted to capture images of the public roads on campus in the near future unless these concerns are addressed.

== Australia ==
=== Australia ===
Australia has no laws prohibiting Google Street View. In October 2010, Google Street View ceased operations in Australia, following months of investigations from Australian authorities. However, on May 4, 2011, Google announced that they planned to begin production again and on July 27, 2011, the Street View imagery for Australian towns and cities was updated.

== Europe ==
=== Austria ===
In Austria, Street View was banned shortly after the launch after Wi-Fi data was collected unauthorized. The ban has since been lifted but strict regulations were put in place that caused Street View to not be deployed despite available data. In July 2018, imagery in various cities in Austria was released. On June 19, 2020, imagery across most of the rest of Austria was released.

=== Czech Republic ===
In the Czech Republic, Street View was banned in September 2010 by the Czech Office for Personal Data Protection after more than half a year of unsuccessful negotiation between the Czech Republic and Google. The office described Google's program as taking pictures "beyond the extent of the ordinary sight from a street", and that it "disproportionately invade citizens' privacy." However, pictures taken before this decision (mostly in 2009) may have remained available online; Google obliged to erase every picture from that period should they be disputed. In May 2011, the ban was lifted after Google lowered the cameras by 30 centimeters (12 in).

=== Denmark ===
According to a Danish media lawyer, Oluf Jørgensen, Google's practice of photographing people on private property is illegal. The Danish data authorities advised people who are photographed by Google to report it to police.

In 2010, Denmark, along with Ireland and Austria, requested that Google delete the WiFi data the company had collected unauthorized. Google complied with all three requests.

=== European Union ===
The Data Protection Directive says that identifiable people have a right to data protection.

A 2010 demand from the European Union would require Google to warn local residents before sending out the cameras. It also required Google to keep the unblurred versions of the photos no longer than 6 months, instead of a year. In turn, Google announced that it was considering canceling Google Street View service in the European Union due to unmanageable requests of the European Commission.

This requirement was abolished on January 1, 2012. Google was instructed to give advance notice online and in the local press before photographing.

=== Germany ===
In an April 2009 interview for the German magazine Focus, Google's Global Privacy Counsel Peter Fleischer remarked that "public opposition to Google Street View in Germany, though not hysterical, had been tougher than in any other country." On the same occasion he stated that the project has now been "essentially aligned with the concerns of data privacy advocates," and that "specific privacy tools would be developed for the German launch while imaging continues at the fastest possible pace." The option to have specific images removed would also apply for locations in Germany.

German Foreign Minister and Vice Chancellor Guido Westerwelle said "I will do all I can to prevent it." However, Interior Minister Thomas de Maizière said that people should not get "hysterical" about the issue and called for "caution in introducing blanket rules allowing objections."

As of October 2010, 244,237 German households have opted out from Street View. Google complied by blurring the facades on the corresponding Street View images. This procedure is misleadingly called 'pixelating' in Germany (German: 'Verpixeln'). These photos were removed in July 2023 awaiting the publication of the 2022 images.

In April 2013 Google was fined €145,000 for illegally recording information from unsecured wireless networks. On July 25, 2023, new Street View images were released (taken in 2022), including the 20 largest cities and many new areas were added. Despite that many areas are not covered in the first 2023 rollout, additions of many more areas as well updated 2023 imagery is scheduled to be published in the future.

=== Greece ===
Google had been stopped from gathering images in Greek cities for its Street View service until it provided further guarantees about privacy.

However, on January 18, 2010, the government legalized the service under the condition that adequate privacy protection would be realized. The service is enabled since June 2014.

=== Lithuania ===
In May 2012 the Lithuanian State Data Protection Inspectorate (SDPI) refused permission for the Google Street View project to operate in Lithuania. The Transport Minister asked the Inspectorate to review its decision. The decision was changed and Google later was able to take photos of streets in Lithuania.

=== Poland ===
In May 2009 the Polish GIODO (Polish: Główny Inspektorat Ochrony Danych Osobowych– Chief Inspectorate for the Protection of Personal Data) expressed doubts about Google Street View and its privacy, mostly concerned about the same issues as in other EU countries. However, from 2010 onwards, Google cars appeared on the Polish streets with the consent of state authorities and in consultation with the Ministry of Sport and Tourism.

In 2011 GIODO began monitoring service Street View and published the report which included non-binding demand that Google should clearly communicate and warn when it's going to take pictures in a certain area at a certain time. It was also proposed that car drivers should be added to the records of persons who process personal data in accordance with the Polish law.

=== Switzerland ===
In November 2009, Switzerland's Federal Data Protection and Information Commissioner Hanspeter Thür announced that his agency would be suing Google because in Street View "numerous faces and vehicle number plates are not made sufficiently unrecognizable from the point of view of data protection".

=== United Kingdom ===
In the first days of launch the UK service drew criticism due to privacy. Images were found of a man leaving a sex shop, a man vomiting and another man being arrested. Some images were removed including those of areas around Downing Street.

The service drew criticism in Belfast that it represented a "reckless" security risk, particularly for showing the exteriors of army bases and police stations so soon after the killing of two soldiers in the 2009 Massereene Barracks shooting, and a police officer.

Soon after the launch human rights watchdog Privacy International sent a formal complaint about the service to the UK Information Commissioner's Office (ICO), which cited more than 200 reports from members of the public who were identifiable on Street View images. Privacy International director Simon Davies said that the organization had filed the complaint due to the "clear embarrassment and damage" Street View had caused to many Britons. He said that Street View fell short of the assurances given by Google to the ICO in July 2008 that had enabled its launch, namely that privacy would be protected by blurring faces and vehicle licence plates, and asked for the system to be "switched off" while an investigation was completed. He said the few cases where Google's face blurring system had failed meant the data used by Street View would fall under UK Data Protection legislation, which requires that subjects give permission for the use of information concerning them.

Davies subsequently sent an open letter to then-Google chief executive Eric Schmidt, accusing the company of briefing journalists against him, claiming Davies was biased in favour of Microsoft. Google has pointed to connections between Microsoft and data protection consultancy 80/20 Thinking, run by Davies, and has said that Davies' connections to Microsoft should be made clear in public, as the credibility of his criticisms is undermined by the fact that he acts as a consultant to companies who are direct rivals and critics of Google, a fact Davies rarely discloses in press releases or comments.

On April 23, 2009, the Information Commissioner ruled that although Google Street View carries a small risk of privacy invasion it should not be stopped. They ruled that "There is no law against anyone taking pictures of people in the street as long as the person using the camera is not harassing people". They also ruled that Google Street View does not contravene the Data Protection Act, as an image of a house held on Street View is not a data protection matter, as data protection is about people's personal information.

In March 2010, Google was forced to remove images of military, security and intelligence installations admitting that it had ignored signs warning that photographing the sites breached the Official Secrets Act with fears that the published photographs could be useful to terrorists.
