= Kobda District =

Coordinates: 50°09′36″N 55°39′00″E

Kobda Қобда
- District
- Қобда ауданы
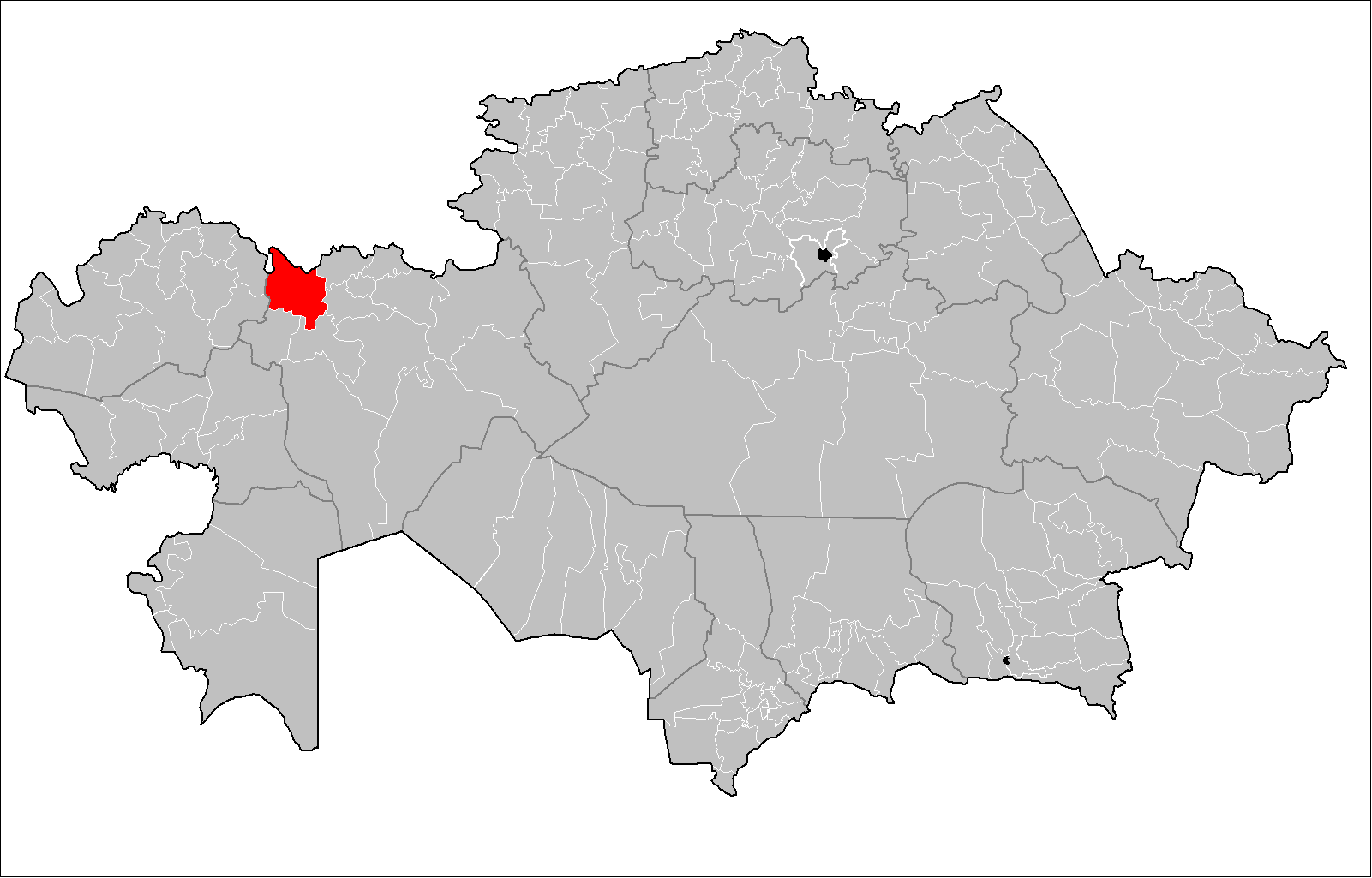
- Country: Kazakhstan
- Region: Aktobe Region
- Administrative center: Kobda

Government
  - Akim: Izgilik Tynymgereev

Population (2013)
  - Total: 19,453
- Time zone: UTC+5 (West)

Kobda (Kazakh: Қобда ауданы, Qobda audany) is a district of Aktobe Region in Kazakhstan. The administrative center of the district is the aul of Kobda. Population: 19,453 (2013 estimate); 19,591 (2009 census results); 27,636 (1999 census results).
