= Outline of Google =

American multinational tech corporation

The following outline is provided as an overview of and topical guide to Google:

The current Google logo was launched on May 19, 2026.

Google is an American multinational technology company specializing in internet-related services and products that include online advertising technologies, search, cloud computing, software, and hardware.

== Google LLC ==
- Motto: "Do the right thing"
- Website: about.google
- CEO: Sundar Pichai
- Co-founder: Larry Page
- Co-founder: Sergey Brin
- Parent company: Alphabet Inc.
- History of Google
- Criticism of Google
- Censorship by Google
- List of mergers and acquisitions by Google
- Google.org
- Google platform
- Googleplex
- Google logo
- Google Doodles
- List of Google Easter eggs
- List of Google April Fools' Day jokes

== Products ==
=== Search ===
- Algorithms:
  - PageRank
  - Google Hummingbird
  - Google Panda
  - Google Penguin
  - Related: Google penalty
- Analysis:
  - Google Trends
  - Google Insights for Search
  - Knowledge Graph
- Google Instant
- Google Voice Search
- Google Real-Time Search
- Google Personalized Search
- Google Web History
- Google Custom Search
- Related:
  - Timeline of Google Search
  - Google Searchology

=== Maps ===
- Google Traffic
- Google Transit
- Google Street View
  - Coverage of Google Street View
    - Google Street View in Africa
    - Google Street View in Antarctica
    - Google Street View in Asia
      - Google Street View in Israel
    - Google Street View in Europe
    - Google Street View in North America
      - Google Street View in Canada
      - Google Street View in the United States
    - Google Street View in Oceania
    - Google Street View in South America
      - Google Street View in Argentina
      - Google Street View in Chile
      - Google Street View in Colombia
  - Google Street View privacy concerns
  - Competition of Google Street View
- Google Aerial View
- Google Earth
  - Google Mars
  - Google Moon
  - Google Sky
- Google Latitude
- Google Maps Navigation
- Google Maps (app)
- Google Map Maker
- Google Maps pin

=== YouTube ===
- History of YouTube
- Social impact of YouTube
- Censorship of YouTube

=== Gmail ===
- Gmail interface
- History of Gmail

=== Chrome ===
- Mobile versions:
  - Google Chrome for Android
  - Google Chrome for iOS
- ChromeOS
- Chrome Web Store
- Google Chrome Apps
- Google Chrome Extensions
- Open-source:
  - Chromium
  - ChromiumOS
- Google Chrome Frame
- Google Chrome Experiments

=== Docs Editors ===
- Google Docs
- Google Sheets
- Google Slides
- Google Drawings
- Google Forms
- Google Sites
- Google Keep

=== Android ===
- Android software development
- Android version history
  - Android 1.0
  - Android 1.1
  - Android Cupcake
  - Android Donut
  - Android Eclair
  - Android Froyo
  - Android Gingerbread
  - Android Honeycomb
  - Android Ice Cream Sandwich
  - Android Jelly Bean
  - Android KitKat
  - Android Lollipop
  - Android Marshmallow
  - Android Nougat
  - Android Oreo
  - Android Pie
  - Android 10
  - Android 11
  - Android 12
  - Android 12L
  - Android 13
  - Android 14
  - Android 15
- Derivatives:
  - Android Wear
  - Android Auto
  - Android TV
- Android One
- List of features in Android
- List of Android launchers
- Android application package
- Android Runtime
- Android rooting
- Android Studio

=== Pixel ===
- Chromebook Pixel
- Pixelbook
- Pixelbook Go
- Pixel C
- Pixel Slate
- Pixel
- Pixel 2
- Pixel 3
- Pixel 3a
- Pixel 4
- Pixel 4a
- Pixel 5
- Pixel 5a
- Pixel 6
- Pixel 6a
- Pixel 7
- Pixel 7a
- Pixel 8
- Pixel 8a
- Pixel Fold
- Pixel Buds

== History ==
=== History of Google ===
- Timeline of Google Search
- History of Gmail
- History of YouTube
- History of Android
  - Android version history
- History of Google+
- History of Google Maps
  - Timeline of Google Street View
- History of Google Docs
- History of Blogger
- History of Google Buzz

=== Product release timeline ===
- 1998 – Google Search
- 2001 – Google Groups
- 2002 – Google News
- 2004 – Orkut
- 2004 – Gmail
- 2005 – iGoogle
- 2005 – Android (acquisition)
- 2005 – Google Maps
- 2005 – Google Reader
- 2006
- 2006 – Google Docs
- 2006 – YouTube (acquisition)
- 2008 – Google Chrome
- 2010 – Google Nexus
- 2010 – Google eBooks
- 2010 – Google Buzz
- 2011 – Google+
- 2012 – Google Drive
- 2012 – Google Play
- 2013 – Google Keep
- 2013 – Google Glass
- 2013 – Google Pixel
- 2014 – Nest (acquisition)
- 2015 – Google Photos
- 2016 – Google Nest (smart speakers)
- 2019 – Stadia
- 2023 – Bard

=== Product discontinuation timeline ===
- 2011 – Google Buzz
- 2011 – Google Notebook
- 2011 – Google Desktop
- 2011 – Google Pack
- 2013 – iGoogle
- 2013 – Google Reader
- 2014 – Orkut
- 2019 – Google+
- 2020 – Google Play Music
- 2023 – Stadia

== Acquisitions ==
See: List of mergers and acquisitions by Alphabet

== Criticism ==
Criticism of Google

- Privacy concerns
- Copyright issues
- Monopoly, restraint of trade, and antitrust
- Criticism of products:
  - Criticism of Gmail
  - Criticism of Google Buzz

== Events ==
=== For developers ===
- Google I/O
- Google Developer Day
- Android Developer Day
- Android Developer Challenge
- Google Code Jam

=== Other ===
- Google Science Fair
- Google Searchology
- Doodle4Google

== Management ==
=== Co-founders ===
- Larry Page: Co-founder
- Sergey Brin: Co-founder

=== Senior leadership ===
- Sundar Pichai: Chief Executive Officer
- Philipp Schindler: Chief Business Officer
- Don Harrison: President, Corporate Development
- Kent Walker: SVP, Global Affairs
- Lorraine Twohill: SVP, Global Marketing

=== Senior product area leadership ===
- Hiroshi Lockheimer: SVP, Platforms & Ecosystems
- Rick Osterloh: SVP, Devices & Services
- Prabhakar Raghavan: SVP, Ads & Commerce
- Ben Gomes: SVP, Search, News & Assistant
- Jeff Dean: SVP, Google AI
- Thomas Kurian: CEO, Google Cloud
- Neal Mohan: CEO, YouTube
- Yasmin Green (businesswoman): CEO, Jigsaw
- Josh Woodward: Senior Director, Google Labs

=== Product area leadership ===
==== Devices & Services ====
- Clay Bavor: VP, AR/VR
- Ana Corrales: COO
- Rishi Chandra: VP, Nest
- Sabrina Ellis: VP, Pixel
- Ivy Ross: VP, Hardware Design & UX
- Pankaj Sultane: VP, Global IT

==== Platforms & Ecosystems ====
- Matías Duarte: VP, Material Design
- Anil Sabharwal: VP, Photos & Personal Communications
- Sameer Samat: VP, Android & Play
- John Solomon: VP, ChromeOS

==== Search, News & Assistant ====
- Brad Bender: VP, News Products
- Manuel Bronstein: VP, Assistant
- Nick Fox: VP, Search & Assistant Products/UX
- Richard Gingras: VP, News
- Pandu Nayak: VP, Search

==== Ads & Commerce ====
- Catherine Courage: VP, Ads & Commerce UX
- Jerry Dischler: VP, Ads
- Oliver Heckmann: VP, Travel

==== Google Cloud ====
- Robert Enslin: President, Global Customer Operations
- Urs Hölzle: SVP, Technical Infrastructure
- Javier Soltero: VP, Google Workspace
- Amit Zavery: VP, Business Application Platform

==== AI ====
- David Feinberg: VP, Health
- Fernando Pereira: VP, Machine Learning
- Jay Yagnik: VP, Machine Perception
- Xavier Amatriain: VP of Product, Core ML/AI

==== YouTube ====
- Robert Kyncl: CBO
- Neal Mohan: CPO
- Scott Silver: VP, Engineering
- Adam Smith: VP, Product Management

== Google's influence on language and culture ==
- Google (verb)
- Google bombing
- Googlewhack
