= Google Street View in Canada =

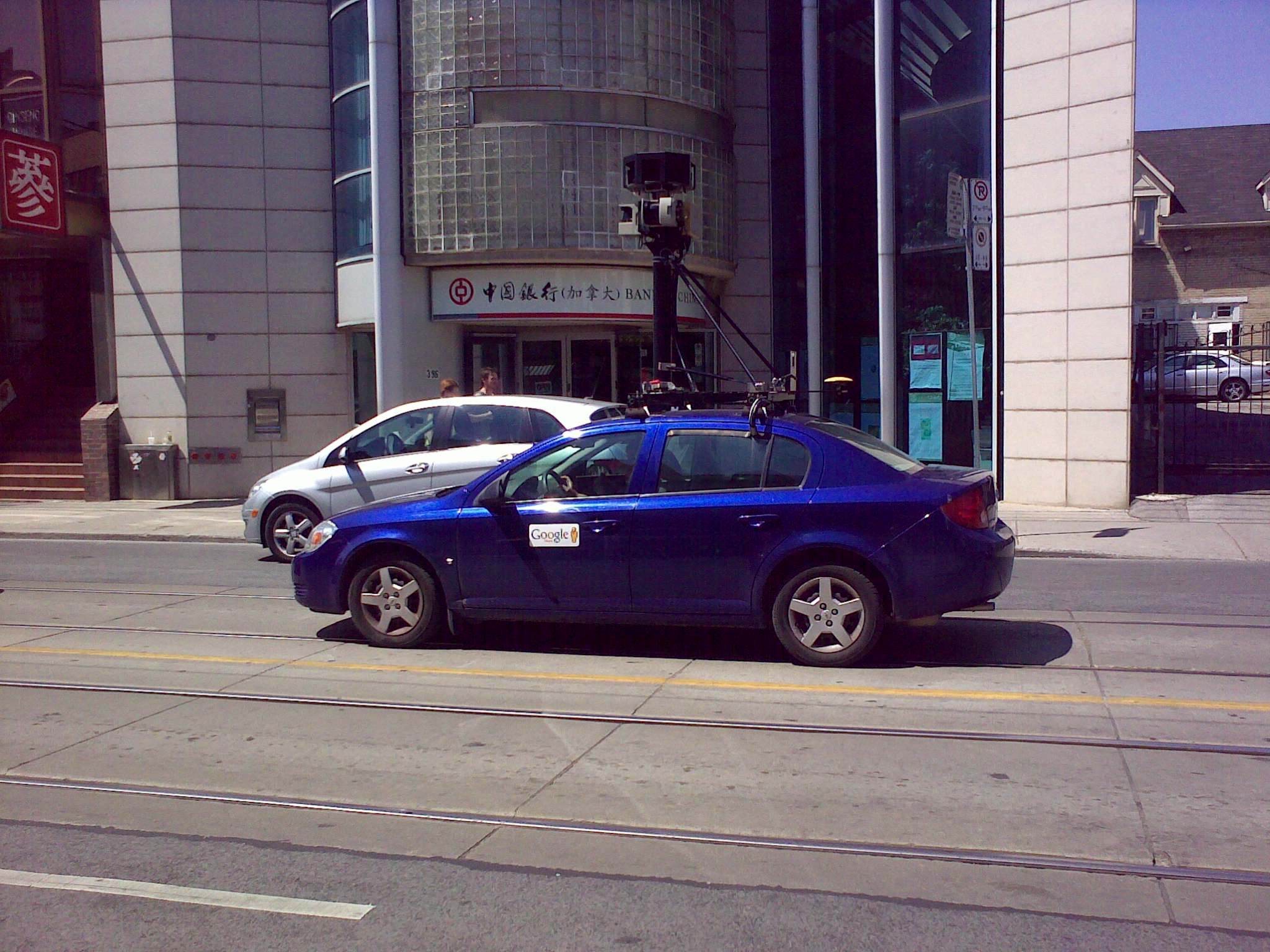
Taken on June 5, 2009, a Google Maps Camera Car (Chevrolet Cobalt) in Chinatown, Toronto, Ontario

In Canada, Google Street View is available on streets, roads, and highways in most parts of the country, with coverage in all provinces and territories. The feature is also provided in Whistler Blackcomb Resort, the location of the 2010 Winter Olympics.

== Background ==
=== Introduction ===
Street View in Canada began on October 7, 2009. On this day, Street View was made available for several large Canadian cities, as well as Banff National Park and Whistler, British Columbia (one of the sites from the 2010 Winter Olympics). This was after long anticipation of the feature in the country. Street View cars had been spotted as early as 2007.

On December 2, 2009, nine more Canadian cities were added, from east to west St. John's, Sherbrooke, Sudbury, London, Winnipeg, Saskatoon, Edmonton, and Victoria.

On February 10, 2010, many more areas of Canada (barring extremely northern and rural areas) were added. Of note, ski runs on Whistler Blackcomb Resort is also covered in this update. As of 2013, the northernmost community imaged is the Arctic island community of Cambridge Bay, Nunavut. As of April 2014, the only Canadian urban areas whose images have not been uploaded are the urban areas within the Labrador region of Newfoundland and Labrador.

On October 10, 2012, street view images in many parts of Canada were updated and some new images of parks, trails, university campuses, and zoos were added.

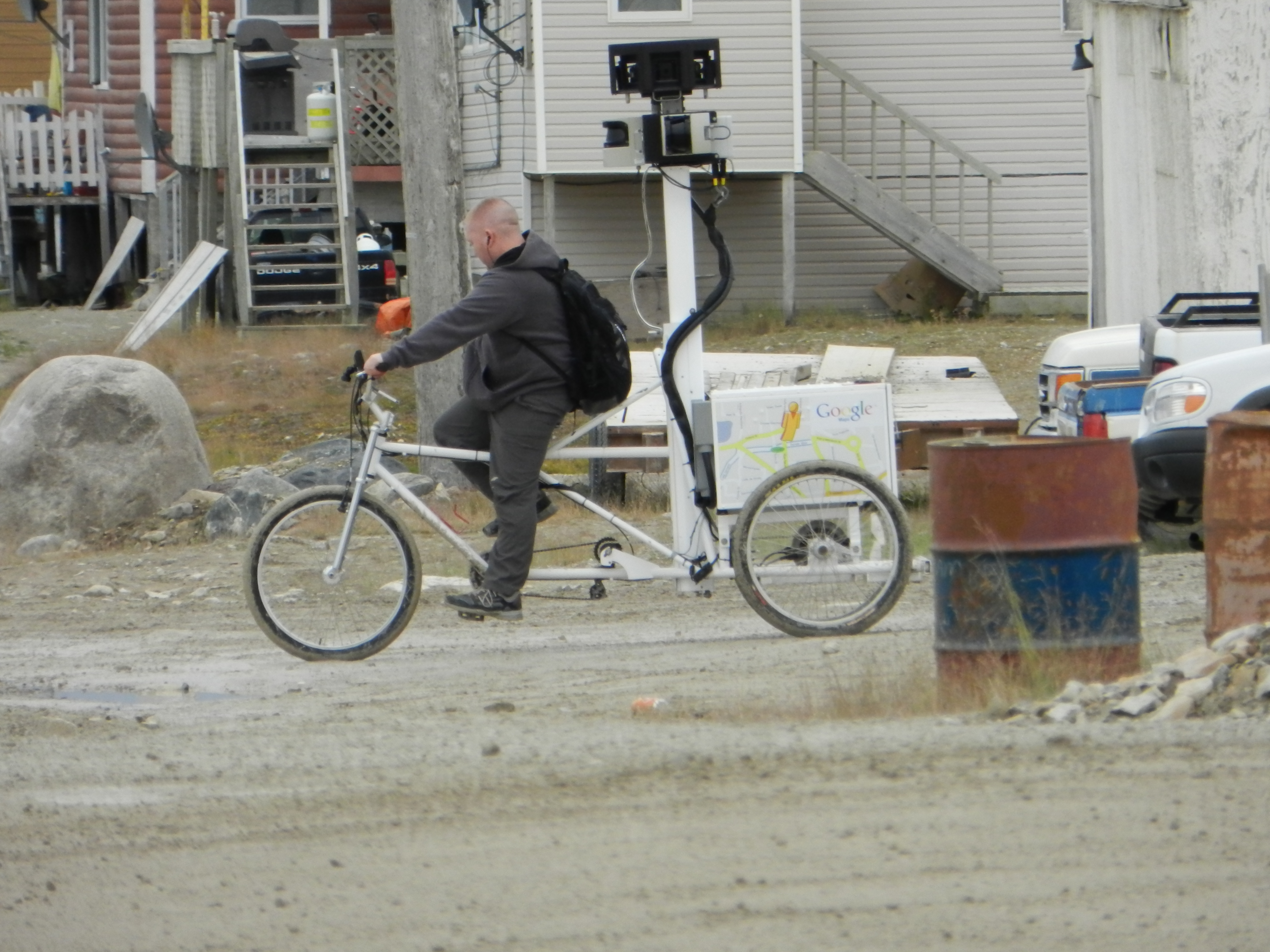
Google Trike in Cambridge Bay, Nunavut, August 23, 2012

On March 19, 2013, the Nunavut city of Iqaluit was imaged. Rather than shipping a car or using a trike, the city was imaged using backpack-mounted cameras for three days. One of the people involved, Chris Kalluk, was responsible for Google mapping Cambridge Bay, his home town. Iqaluit officially appeared on Street View on July 9, 2013, coinciding with Nunavut Day. With the inclusion of Iqaluit, all provincial/territorial capitals have been imaged and are available on Street View.

In 2013, Parks Canada began a 2-year collaboration with Google to provide street view images of the most iconic parks and heritage places in Canada. In November 2013, the first set of images were released.

In 2014, Street View imagery of Fort McMurray was uploaded. The northern Alberta city was the last remaining major Canadian urban area to be imaged. In 2016, Street View imagery of various roads in Nain were uploaded. The only communities in Labrador with street view images are Red Bay, Churchill Falls, Happy Valley-Goose Bay, and Nain.

=== Concerns over legality ===
Canada was one of the first countries following the introduction in the United States where the prospect of introducing Street View was known to the public. In 2007, following the debut of Street View in the United States, concern was brought up that the same in Canada may not be legal. Canada's laws regarding privacy differ from those of the United States. Images of the streets in Canada were taken early on by Immersive Media Company, the contractor used by Google at the time that took most of the early images. But it would be a long time before Street View would be seen in Canada, and Street View in several other countries would predate that of Canada.

Canada's Federal Privacy Commissioner, Jennifer Stoddart, warned Google and Immersive Media that Street View violated the country's Personal Information Protection and Electronic Documents Act (PIPEDA), which prohibits commercial use of personal data without the individual's consent.

Google responded by agreeing to respect privacy laws in Canada and other countries.

Ultimately, Google agreed to blur faces and license plates that appeared in images taken. Google has since done the same in other countries, including the United States, regardless of whether or not it is legally compelled to do so.

== Timeline of introductions ==
Note: Below locations available in a newer high-quality view, except italic indicates locations partially available in the high-quality view. Almost all of Canada can be seen in a high-quality street view.

Date	Major locations added
Wednesday, October 7, 2009	Quebec City, Toronto, Brampton, Ottawa, Hamilton, Montreal, Kitchener, Waterloo, Halifax, Mississauga, Calgary, Banff, Metro Vancouver, Abbotsford, Chilliwack
Wednesday, December 2, 2009	Edmonton, Victoria, London, Greater Sudbury, Sherbrooke, Saskatoon, St. John's, Winnipeg
Tuesday, February 9, 2010	Whistler Blackcomb, Venues of the 2010 Winter Olympics, Yellowknife, Windsor, Sydney, Charlottetown, Prince Albert, Whitehorse, Inuvik, Regina, Chicoutimi, Nanaimo, Courtenay, Powell River, Rouleau, Kelowna, Kamloops, Lethbridge, Lloydminster, Thunder Bay, Timmins, Haines Junction, Amos, Val-d'Or, Trois-Rivières, Woodstock, New Glasgow, Bathurst, Miramichi, Summerside, Collingwood, Manitoulin Island, Englehart, Prince George, Barrie, Owen Sound, Clinton, Leamington, Kingston, Amherstburg, Chatham, Blenheim, Brantford, Cambridge, Guelph, Peterborough, Trenton, Thompson, Grande Prairie, Prince Rupert, Red Deer, Rimbey, Drayton Valley, Whitecourt, Westlock, Camrose, Sainte-Marie, Montmagny, Grand Falls, Moncton, Fredericton, Gander, and road connections
Wednesday, October 10, 2012	Updated images in many parts of Canada and new images of some parks, trails, university campuses and zoos
Wednesday, November 28, 2012	Cambridge Bay and more locations in Canada
Monday, July 1, 2013	Parliament of Canada
Tuesday, July 9, 2013	Iqaluit
Wednesday, November 20, 2013	Fortress of Louisbourg, Moraine Lake, Lake Louise, and other locations in Canada
Wednesday, December 4, 2013	Office of the Canadian Prime Minister
Thursday, February 27, 2014	Churchill, Manitoba
Monday, April 21, 2014	More locations and updated images in Canada

== Areas included ==
Province/Territory	Major cities/areas
Alberta	Airdrie, Banff, Banff National Park, Beaumont, Brooks, Calgary, Camrose, Canmore, Chestermere, Cochrane, Cold Lake, Edmonton, Edson, Fort McMurray, Fort Saskatchewan, Grande Cache, Grande Prairie, High River, Hinton, Jasper, Jasper National Park, Lacombe, Lake Louise, Leduc, Lethbridge, Lloydminster, Medicine Hat, Okotoks, Red Deer, St. Albert, Spruce Grove, Stony Plain, Strathcona County, Strathmore, Sylvan Lake, Wetaskiwin.
British Columbia	Abbotsford, Burnaby, Campbell River, Central Saanich, Chilliwack, Coldstream, Colwood, Comox, Coquitlam, Courtenay, Cranbrook, Dawson Creek, Delta, Esquimalt, Fort St. John, Gabriola Island, Kamloops, Kelowna, Lake Country, Langford, City and District of Langley, Maple Ridge, Mission, Nanaimo, Nelson, New Westminster, North Cowichan, North Saanich, North Vancouver (city), North Vancouver (district municipality), Oak Bay, Parksville, Penticton, Pitt Meadows, Port Alberni, Port Coquitlam, Port Moody, Powell River, Prince George, Prince Rupert, Quesnel, Richmond, Saanich, Salmon Arm, Sidney, Sooke, Squamish, Summerland, Surrey, Terrace, Vancouver, Vernon, Victoria, West Kelowna, West Vancouver, Whistler, White Rock, Williams Lake
Manitoba	Brandon, Churchill, Dauphin, Portage la Prairie, Steinbach, Thompson, Winnipeg
New Brunswick	Bathurst, Campbellton, Fredericton, Miramichi, Moncton, Saint John
Newfoundland and Labrador	Clarenville, Conception Bay South, Corner Brook, Gander, Grand Falls-Windsor, Stephenville, St. Anthony, Marystown, Mount Pearl, Paradise, St. John's, Torbay, Labrador City, Happy Valley-Goose Bay
Northwest Territories	Fort McPherson, Inuvik, Yellowknife
Nova Scotia	Halifax, New Glasgow, Sydney, Truro
Nunavut	Cambridge Bay, Iqaluit, Grise Fiord, Quttinirpaaq National Park, Resolute Bay
Ontario	Ajax, Aurora, Barrie, Brampton, Brantford, Brockville, Burlington, Cambridge, Dundas, Guelph, Hamilton, Kingston, Kitchener, Leeds and the Thousand Islands, London, Markham, Mississauga, Newmarket, Niagara Falls, North Bay, Oakville, Oshawa, Ottawa, Peterborough, Pickering, Point Edward, Richmond Hill, Russell, St. Catharines, Sarnia, Sault Ste. Marie, Sudbury, Thunder Bay, Timmins, Toronto, Vaughan, Waterloo, Whitby, Windsor
Prince Edward Island	Charlottetown, Summerside
Quebec	Blainville, Boisbriand, Boucherville, Brossard, Charlemagne, Delson, Deux-Montagnes, Drummondville, Gatineau, La Prairie, Laval, L'Île-Perrot area, Longueuil, Lorraine, Montreal, Pointe-Calumet, Quebec City, Repentigny, Rosemère, Saguenay, Saint-Constant, Sainte-Catherine, Sainte-Marthe-sur-le-Lac, Sainte-Thérèse, Saint-Eustache, Saint-Jean-sur-Richelieu, Saint-Lambert, Sherbrooke, Terrebonne, Trois-Rivières, Varennes
Saskatchewan	Battleford, Estevan, Lloydminster, Moose Jaw, North Battleford, Prince Albert, Regina, Saskatoon, Swift Current, Yorkton
Yukon	Carcross, Carmacks, Dawson City, Mayo, Ross River, Whitehorse

== Privacy concerns ==
While Canada, like other jurisdictions, has raised the issue of privacy concerns regarding Google Street View, the presence of Google cameras in one Canadian city in March 2009 gave rise to a different complaint. Les MacPherson, a columnist with The StarPhoenix in Saskatoon, complained in a March 28, 2009, column that the timing of the imaging, at the end of a protracted winter season and before the true onset of spring would cast an unfavourable image of Saskatoon and other cities. "What worries me more than any loss of privacy is the prospect of presenting to the world a highly unflattering impression of Canadian cities. With the possible exception of Victoria, they do not show off well in the spring. Google could not have picked a more inauspicious time to do its scanning. Saskatoon is unfortunately typical. For Google to record its images of the city at this most visually unappealing time of year is like photographing a beautiful woman who has just awakened from a six-month coma," he wrote. In early October 2009, the first Canadian cities began to appear on Street View; several, including Saskatoon, were not included in the initial roll-out. One city that was included, Calgary, included images taken in both summer and winter. Images of Saskatoon were rolled out on December 2, 2009.

In October 2010, Stoddart said that Google violated the privacy of thousands of Canadians when the cars inadvertently collected personal data about them while filming Street View in the country. Google apologized for the breach.
