= Google Street View in Colombia =

Interactive street panorama technology

Screenshot of Street view for Manizales on Google Earth

In June 2012, Google Colombia announced to the media that the Google Street View cars would be circulating throughout Colombia collecting images.

In September 2013, Google Street View became available. It covers a major part of the Colombian territory including 21 cities and many smaller towns. Among the major cities covered by street view are Bogotá, Cartagena, Manizales, Barranquilla, Bucaramanga, Santa Marta and Neiva.

The initial collecting of images begun in Bogotá. Google explained to the Colombian media that the well known privacy concerns would be addressed with the blurring of faces and car plates. They also explained that a contact form would be available for users if they believed that there was data that they deemed private.

By the time of the first release some locations were not still covered, but Google assured that within the next months they would cover those areas still missing; namely Medellín and Cali.

According to Semana magazine, the first stage of image collection included a coverage of more than 30,000 km of streets and roads.

In addition to the cars, Google also used trikes since they were convenient for many narrow streets and colonial areas where cars might not be allowed.

Google introduced street view officially to the Colombian people and the Colombian media at a press conference at the Interactive Center Maloka, a center for the diffusion of knowledge in science and technology located in the city of Bogotá. Google executive for Colombia explained that Maloka had been chosen because it was known as a place that inspired exploration and innovation.

During a press conference general manager for Google in Colombia Laura Camacho explained that Colombia was the 4th country in Latin America to have a major street view coverage after Mexico, Brazil and Chile (which was started almost at the same time). She also expressed that after a year of operations in Colombia, the releasing of Street View in this country, implied an acknowledgment by Google that Colombia is an important market in Latin America.

== See also ==
- Google Street View in Latin America
- Google Street View in Canada
