= Google Street View in Argentina =

Google's Street View program in Argentina began with the filming of streets and roads in October 2013. On September 25, 2014, most of the country's cities were made available online, including Buenos Aires, Córdoba, Rosario and Mendoza. As of September 2015, coverage is high, with over three-fourths of cities with over 25,000 people having most of its streets photographed.

== Timeline of introductions ==
Date	Major locations added
Monday, March 18, 2013	The World's Highest Peaks in Street View Special collection including: Aconcagua Summit, Camp Colera, Camp 1 and 2, Plaza Argentina, Casa de Piedra, Pampa de Leñas.
Friday, September 26, 2014	Buenos Aires, 3 de Febrero, Almirante Brown, Alta Gracia, Avellaneda, Ayacucho, Azul, Bahía Blanca, Bariloche, Berazategui, Berisso, Brandsen, Caleta Olivia, Campana, Cañada de Gomez, Cañuelas, Capilla del Señor, Carmen de Patagones, Casilda, Chimbas, Chivilcoy, Cipolletti, Clorinda, Comodoro Rivadavia, Concepción del Uruguay, Córdoba, Corrientes, Cruz Alta, El Calafate, Ensenada, Escobar, Esquel, Esteban Echeverría, Ezeiza, Federación, Florencio Varela, Formosa, General Güemes, General Pico, General Rodríguez, Godoy Cruz, Gualeguaychú, Guaraní, Hurlingham, Ituzaingó, José C. Paz, Junín, Junín de Los Andes, La Banda, La Costa, La Matanza, La Plata, La Rioja, Lanús, Las Heras, Lomas de Zamora, Luján, Luján de Cuyo, Malvinas Argentinas, Mar del Plata, Marcos Juarez, Marcos Paz, Mendoza, Merlo, Moreno, Morón, Necochea, Neuquén, Oberá, Olavarría, Oliva, Oncativo, Orán, Palpalá, Paraná, Paso de los Libres, Pergamino, Pilar, Pocito, Posadas, Presidencia Roque Saenz Peña, Presidente Perón, Puerto Iguazú, Puerto Madryn, Quilmes, Rafaela, Rawson, Resistencia, Río Cuarto, Río Gallegos, Río Grande, Río Tercero, Rosario, Rosario de Lerma, Salta, San Antonio de Areco, San Fernando, San Fernando del Valle de Catamarca, San Francisco, San Isidro, San Juan, San Justo, San Lorenzo, San Luis, San Martín, San Martín de Los Andes, San Miguel, San Nicolás, San Pedro, San Pedro de Jujuy, San Rafael, San Salvador de Jujuy, San Vicente, Santa Fe, Santa Lucía, Santa Rosa, Santiago del Estero, Tafí Viejo, Tandil, Termas de Rio Hondo, Tigre, Trelew, Tres Arroyos, Tucumán, Ushuaia, Venado Tuerto, Vicente López, Victoria, Viedma, Villa Angela, Villa Carlos Paz, Villa Constitución, Villa Gobernador Gálvez, Villa María, Villa Mercedes, Villaguay, Zárate.
Thursday, September 3, 2015	Concordia, Chacabuco, Curuzú Cuatiá, Bell Ville, Trenque Lauquen, Bragado, Pehuajó, Villa Gesell, Bella Vista, Baradero, General José de San Martín, Lincoln, Juan José Castelli, Pinamar, and expanded coverage of existing locations.

== Coverage ==
Coverage as of September 2015 in cities with over 25,000 people, accounting for three-fourths of the country's total population:

Coverage	Settlements	Population	%
High	167	26,626,412	88.47
Medium	28	2,614,868	8.69
Low	20	758,872	2.52
None	3	95,725	0.32
Cities over 25,000 inhabitants	218	30,095,877	100.00
Other settlements	3,810	10,021,219	24.98
Total population (2010)	4,028	40,117,096	100.00

Province	Coverage	Cities over 25,000 inhabitants
Buenos Aires (city)
Buenos Aires (city)	High	Buenos Aires (Comuna 13, Comuna 14, Comuna 7, Comuna 4, Comuna 1, Comuna 12, Comuna 11, Comuna 3, Comuna 8, Comuna 15, Comuna 5, Comuna 6, Comuna 10, Comuna 9, Comuna 2).
Buenos Aires
Buenos Aires	High	Greater Buenos Aires (La Matanza, Lomas de Zamora, Quilmes, Almirante Brown, Merlo, Lanús, Moreno, Florencio Varela, General San Martín, Tigre, Avellaneda, Tres de Febrero, Berazategui, Malvinas Argentinas, Moron, Esteban Echeverría, Pilar, San Isidro, San Miguel, Vicente López, José C. Paz, Escobar, Hurlingham, Ituzaingo, Ezeiza, San Fernando), La Plata, Mar del Plata, San Nicolás de los Arroyos, Zárate, Luján, Pergamino, Olavarría, Berisso, Junín, Campana, General Rodríguez, Presidente Perón, San Vicente, Ensenada, Azul, Marcos Paz, San Pedro, Tres Arroyos, Chacabuco, Balcarce, Chascomus, Trenque Lauquen, Bragado, Pehuajó, Cañuelas, Villa Gesell, Miramar, Baradero, Lincoln, Saladillo, San Carlos de Bolívar, Dolores, Pinamar.
Buenos Aires	Medium	Bahía Blanca, Tandil, Necochea – Quequén, Chivilcoy, Mercedes, Lobos, Mar de Ajo – San Bernardo.
Buenos Aires	Low	Punta Alta, Salto, Arrecifes.
Buenos Aires	None	9 de Julio.
Catamarca
Catamarca	High	San Fernando del Valle de Catamarca, San Isidro.
Chaco
Chaco	High	Resistencia, Presidencia Roque Sáenz Peña, Barranqueras.
Chaco	Medium	Juan José Castelli.
Chaco	Low	Villa Ángela, Fontana, General José de San Martín.
Chaco	None	Charata.
Chubut
Chubut	High	Comodoro Rivadavia, Trelew, Puerto Madryn, Esquel.
Córdoba
Córdoba	High	Cordoba, Río Cuarto, Villa María, Villa Carlos Paz, Alta Gracia, Río Tercero, Bell Ville, La Calera, Jesús María, Villa Dolores, Villa Allende.
Córdoba	Medium	San Francisco, Cruz del Eje, Marcos Juárez.
Corrientes
Corrientes	High	Corrientes, Paso de los Libres.
Corrientes	Low	Goya, Curuzú Cuatiá, Mercedes, Gobernador Virasoro, Bella Vista.
Entre Ríos
Entre Ríos	High	Concordia, Concepción del Uruguay, Victoria.
Entre Ríos	Medium	Paraná, Gualeguaychú, Gualeguay, Villaguay.
Entre Ríos	None	Chajarí.
Formosa
Formosa	High	Formosa, Clorinda.
Jujuy
Jujuy	High	San Salvador de Jujuy, Libertador General San Martín.
Jujuy	Medium	San Pedro, Palpalá.
Jujuy	Low	Perico.
La Pampa
La Pampa	High	Santa Rosa, General Pico.
La Rioja
La Rioja	High	La Rioja, Chilecito.
Mendoza
Mendoza	High	Mendoza (Guaymallén, Godoy Cruz, Las Heras, San Rafael, Mendoza, Maipú, Luján de Cuyo), San Martín, Rivadavia, Tunuyán.
Mendoza	Low	General Alvear.
Misiones
Misiones	High	Posadas, Oberá, Eldorado, Puerto Iguazú.
Misiones	Low	Posadas (expansión).
Neuquén
Neuquén	High	Neuquén, Cutral Có, Centenario, Plottier, San Martín de los Andes.
Neuquén	Low	Zapala.
Río Negro
Río Negro	High	San Carlos de Bariloche, General Roca, Cipolletti, Viedma, Villa Regina.
Salta
Salta	High	Salta, San Ramón de la Nueva Orán, San José de Metán.
Salta	Medium	General Güemes.
Salta	Low	Tartagal.
San Juan
San Juan	High	Rawson, San Juan, Rivadavia, Santa Lucía.
San Juan	Medium	Chimbas, Caucete.
San Luis
San Luis	High	Villa Mercedes.
San Luis	Medium	San Luis.
Santa Cruz
Santa Cruz	High	Río Gallegos.
Santa Cruz	Low	Caleta Olivia.
Santa Fe
Santa Fe	High	Rosario, Rafaela, Venado Tuerto, Santo Tomé, Villa Constitución, San Lorenzo, Granadero Baigorria, Casilda, Capitán Bermúdez, Cañada de Gómez.
Santa Fe	Medium	Santa Fe, Villa Gobernador Gálvez, Reconquista.
Santa Fe	Low	Esperanza, Pérez.
Santiago del Estero
Santiago del Estero	Medium	Santiago del Estero, La Banda, Termas de Río Hondo.
Santiago del Estero	Low	Frías.
Tierra del Fuego
Tierra del Fuego	High	Río Grande, Ushuaia.
Tucumán
Tucumán	High	San Miguel de Tucumán, Banda del Río Salí, Yerba Buena – Marcos Paz, Villa Mariano Moreno – El Colmenar, Concepción, Tafí Viejo, Aguilares.
Tucumán	Medium	Alderetes.

== See also ==
- Google Street View in Latin America
