= Tafí Viejo, Tucumán =

Tafí Viejo
- Town
- Coat of arms

- Location of Tafí Viejo in Argentina
- Coordinates: 26°44′S 65°16′W
- Country: Argentina
- Province: Tucumán
- Department: Tafí Viejo
- Established: May 3, 1900

Government
  - Intendant: Alejandra Rodríguez (PJ)
- Elevation: 591 m (1,939 ft)

Population (2010 census)
  - Total: 39,601
- Demonym: taficeño/a
- Time zone: UTC−3 (ART)
- CPA base: T4103
- Dialing code: +54 0381
- Website: Official website

Tafí Viejo is an Argentine town in the Province of Tucumán. The municipality's population at the 2001 census [INDEC] was 48,459 inhabitants. Tafí Viejo is located 15 km (9 mi) north of the city of San Miguel de Tucumán, just west of National Route 9; today, it is an important suburb in the larger city's metro area.

== Overview ==
Located about 600 m (2000 ft) above sea level at the feet of the Aconquija Mountains to the west, the area was originally populated by Aymará-speaking peoples, who gave the site its name with a term meaning "where the cold winds blow." The arrival of the Northern Central Railway in 1882 made the location a popular weekend getaway for San Miguel de Tucumán gentry during the late nineteenth century, and on May 3, 1900, it was founded as San José de Calasanz. The hamlet was chosen as the site for one of Argentina's largest railway equipment factories in 1904 and the facility was inaugurated in May 1910.

The growing town was formally reestablished with its original name, Tafí Viejo, on June 2, 1939. Following the railways' nationalization by President Juan Perón in 1948, the facility was modernized and expanded; during the 1950s, it employed over 5,600 workers, who turned out 24 freight cars, 11 passenger cars and two steam locomotives monthly. In the interest of trimming the state-owned railways concern Ferrocarriles Argentinos' chronic deficits, however, the dictatorship at the time had the facility closed in 1980, dealing Tafí Viejo a serious economic blow.

Reopened by President Raúl Alfonsín in 1984, the facility could not recover its role as the city's largest employer and, in 1996, Governor Antonio Domingo Bussi had the installation shuttered yet again. Ultimately, President Néstor Kirchner had the factory re-opened shortly after taking office in 2003.

Continuing to prosper despite past setbacks, Tafí Viejo has also developed thriving services and tourism sectors. Limited in the past to weekend visits from metro area residents, the city has been attracting wider interest through the Alpa-Puyo resort, a compound of cabins, guided tours and excursions, as well as a small zoo.

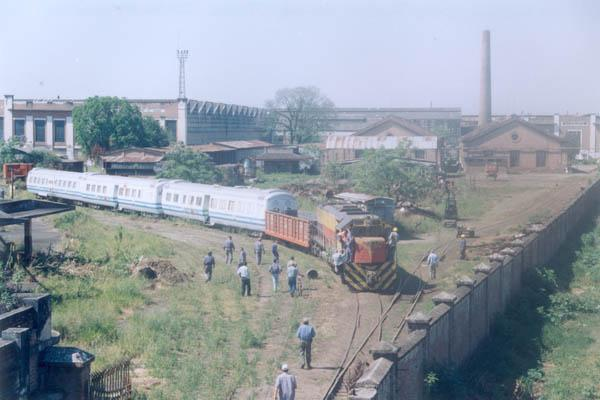
The Tafí Viejo railway works, shortly after their 2003 reopening.

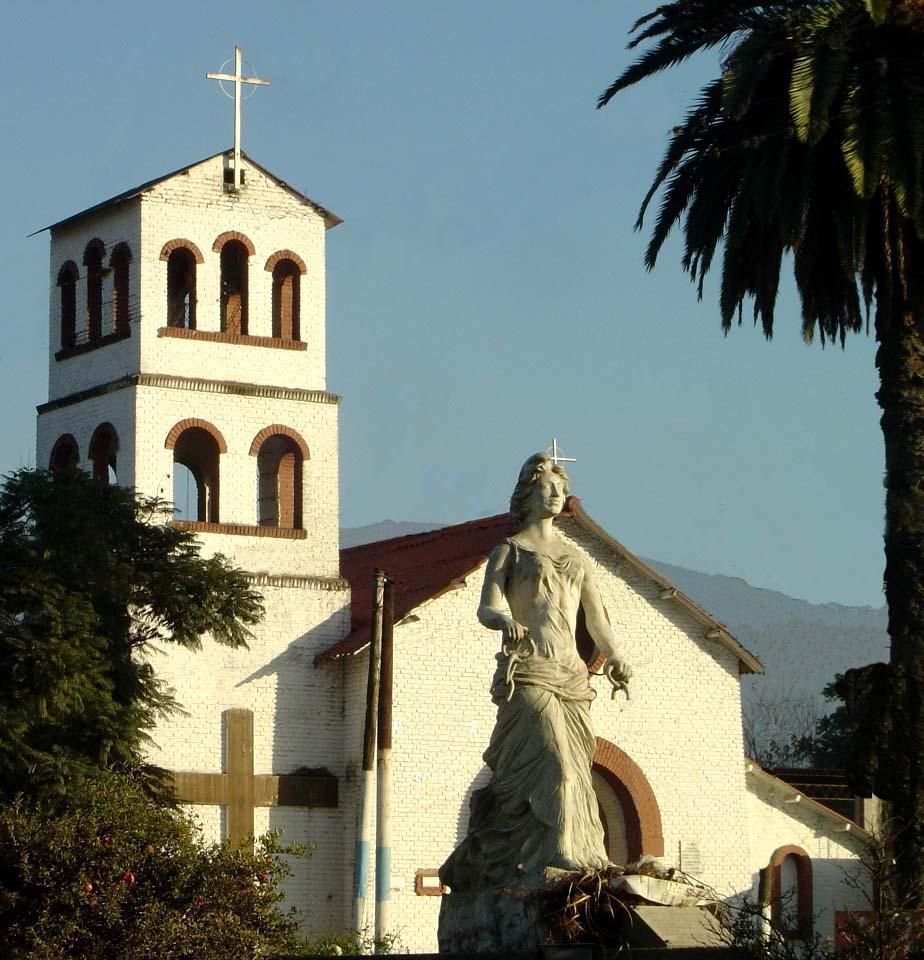
Christ the Worker Church.

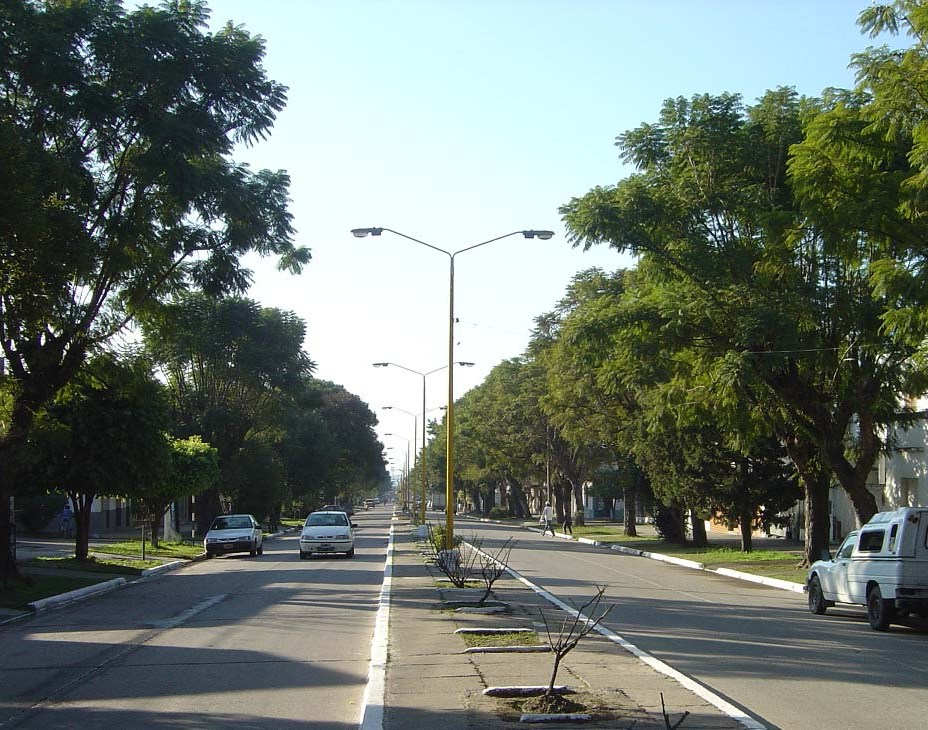
Leandro Alem Avenue.

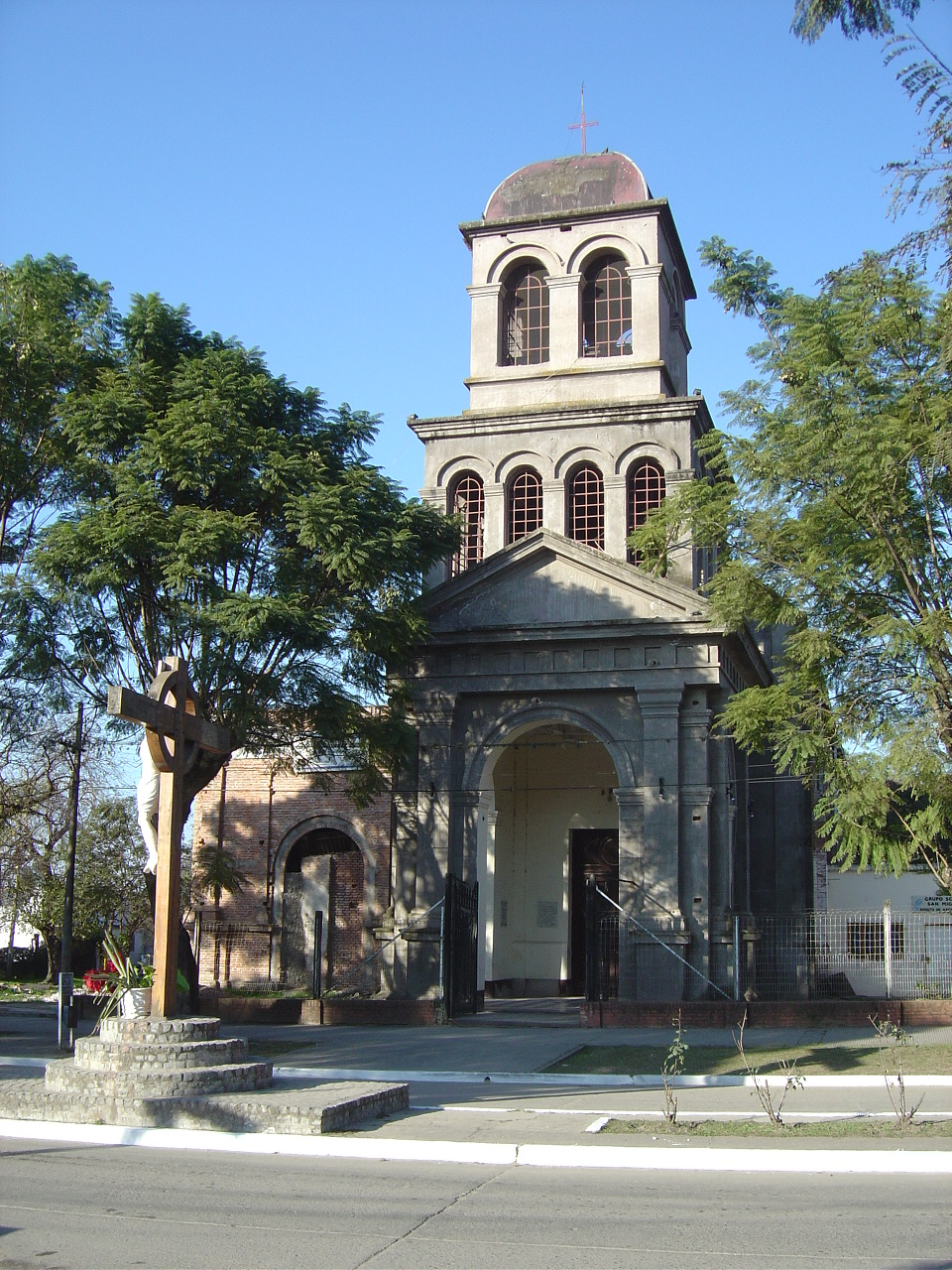
Tafí Viejo Catholic Parish.
