= Nunavut Day =

Canadian public holiday

- Observed by: Nunavut, Canada
- Date: July 9
- Frequency: annual

Nunavut Day (Inuktitut: ᓄᓇᕗᑦ ᐅᓪᓗᖓ, Nunavut ullunga) is a public holiday in the Canadian territory of Nunavut.

== Origin ==
On July 9, 1993, following the passing of the 1982 plebiscite on the question of the division of the Northwest Territories, the Parliament of Canada passed the Nunavut Act, establishing the territory of Nunavut, to come into operation sometime in the future. On April 1, 1999, Nunavut became a legally distinct territory from the Northwest Territories, coming into being as a territory on this date. The following year, in 2000, 'Nunavut Day' was celebrated on April 1. However, it was felt that the 1993 Nunavut Land Claims Agreement had greater significance to the people of Nunavut, so the holiday was moved to July 9 the following year.

== Current form ==
Nunavut Day is a public holiday, per the 2001 Nunavut Day Holiday Order. Despite being a declared public holiday in the territory, many organizations and stores remain open throughout the day. Employees of the federal government of Canada must still work on this day, as it is not treated as a public holiday for federal public servants (despite being deemed as such for territorial public servants). Several cultural activities and events are organized throughout the day, including community-wide breakfasts, traditional dancing, games, Nunavut history competitions, policy announcements by the Government of Nunavut or related bodies and speeches by leaders of local communities. Traditional food is also served in some communities. For example, the 2010 Iqaluit Nunavut Day celebrations featured a barbecue of burgers made from muskox meat.
