= Google Traffic =

Feature on Google Maps

- Website type: Web mapping
- Available in: Multilingual
- Owner: Google
- Website: maps.google.com
- Registration: No
- Launched: February 28, 2007; 19 years ago
- Current status: Active

Google Traffic is a feature on Google Maps that displays traffic conditions in real time on major roads and highways. Google Traffic can be viewed at the Google Maps website, or by using the Google Maps application on a handheld device.

Google Traffic works by analyzing the GPS-determined locations transmitted to Google by a large number of mobile phone users. By calculating the speed of users along a length of road, Google is able to generate a live traffic map. Google processes the incoming raw data about mobile phone device locations, and then excludes anomalies such as postal vehicles which make frequent stops. When a threshold of users in a particular area is noted, the overlay along roads and highways on the Google map changes color.

== History ==
Early versions of Google Maps provided information to users about how long it would take to travel a particular road in heavy traffic conditions. Traffic information was based on historical traffic data and was not particularly accurate.

In 2004 Google acquired ZipDash, a company specializing in realtime traffic analysis. In 2007, Google integrated ZipDash's technology into Google Maps, offering traffic data based on information gathered anonymously from cellular phone users.

== Crowdsourced traffic data ==
Cellular telephone companies constantly monitor the locations of user devices. One tracking method is trilateration, whereby the distance (time delay) to three or more surrounding cell phone towers is measured. Another tracking method monitors the exact user coordinates determined by a GPS receiver inside the phone. GPS-equipped cellphones began appearing in 2004, and by 2011, the U.S. Federal Communications Commission required that all new cellular phones be able to pinpoint location to within 50 feet.

Soliciting electronic information from a large group of people this way is referred to as crowd-sourcing.

Google stated: "When we combine your speed with the speed of other phones on the road, across thousands of phones moving around a city at any given time, we can get a pretty good picture of live traffic conditions".

== Features ==
Google Traffic is available by selecting "Traffic" from a drop-down menu on Google Maps. A colored overlay appears on top of major roads and motorways, with green representing a normal speed of traffic, orange representing slower traffic conditions, red indicating congestion, and dark red (previously red and black) indicates nearly stopped or stop-and-go traffic. A red and white dashed line indicates a road closure. If there is no data available, an overlay line will not appear.

Users can use the "search" feature to display traffic in a particular area. For example, a user may type into the search box "traffic near Edmonton, Alberta" to see traffic for that city on the map. Another feature uses historical data to show users the "typical traffic" for an area based on the time of day and day of the week. Google Traffic also displays "traffic incidents", such as construction, accidents, and road closures. In addition, Google Traffic can be viewed while using Google Maps’ "directions" feature.

== Privacy concerns ==
Google has stated: "we understand that many people would be concerned about telling the world how fast their car was moving if they also had to tell the world where they were going". Google built in a number of features to safeguard the identities and locations of users who choose to provide Google with traffic data.

=== Opt-out option ===
Mobile devices which use Google's Android operating system come equipped with the ability to send location data to Google, while non-Android devices which use Google's map application are also able to transmit their location data to Google. However, options available in each phone's settings allow users not to share information about their location with Google Maps. On Google's website, detailed opt-out instructions are available for various devices and operating systems, including Android, BlackBerry, iPhone/iPod, Palm webOS, Symbian S60, Windows Mobile, and Sony Ericsson. Google stated, "Once you disable or opt out of My Location, Maps will not continue to send radio information back to Google servers to determine your handset's approximate location".

=== Anonymity of location data ===
Google has stated that the speed and location information it collects to calculate traffic conditions is anonymous. Google also identifies the start and end points of every trip it monitors, and permanently deletes that data so that information about where each user came from and went to remains private.

== See also ==
- Google Maps Navigation
- INRIX
- Traffic reporting
