= Venues of the 2010 Winter Olympics =

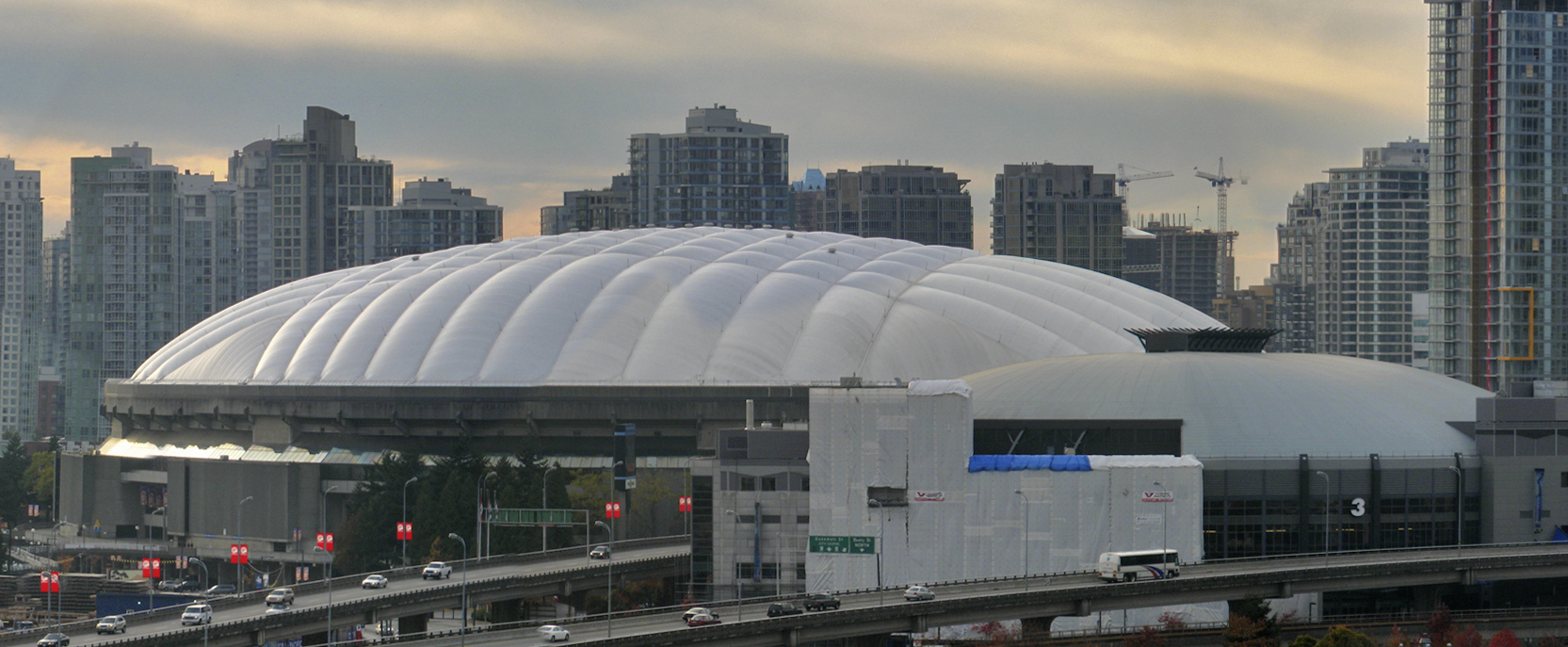
BC Place Stadium hosted the opening and closing ceremonies of the 2010 Winter Olympics.

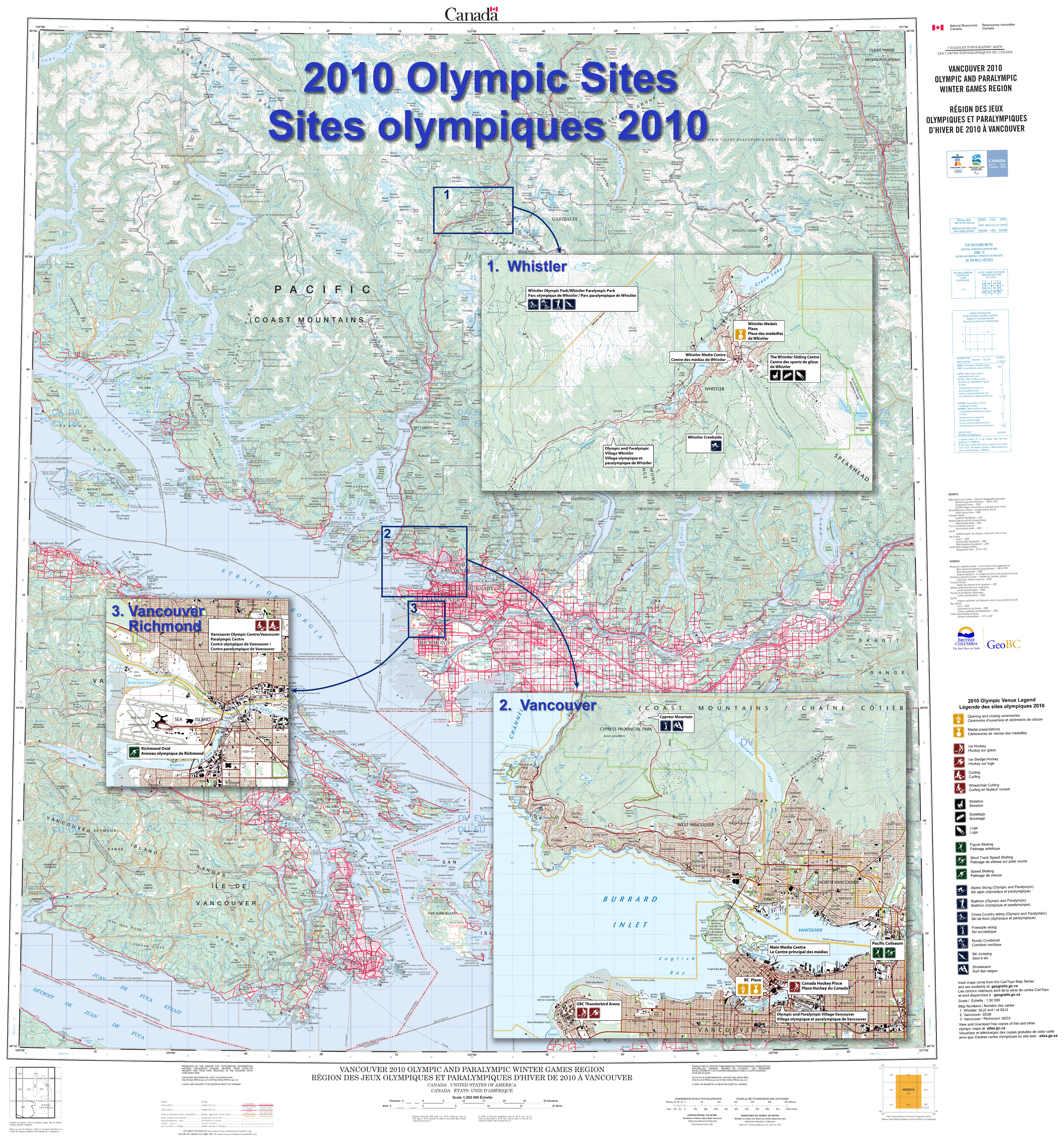
Olympic sites map

For the 2010 Winter Olympics, a total of ten sports venues were used, seven in Vancouver (including BC Place), and three in Whistler. The majority of ice sport events were held in Vancouver, while Whistler, which normally serves as a ski resort, hosted the snow events. Six non-competition venues, three each in Vancouver and Whistler, provided athlete housing, space for media, and locations for ceremonies associated with the Games.

In its 2002 evaluation of Vancouver's bid during the bidding process for the 2010 Games, the Evaluation Commission of the International Olympic Committee (IOC) highlighted the number and quality of existing competition and training facilities as one of the bid's strengths. Of the competition venues that the bid proposed for use during the Games, six required new construction, with the remainder already built in Vancouver and Whistler. The Vancouver Organizing Committee for the Olympic Games (VANOC), which is responsible for the construction and maintenance of facilities for the Games, pledged that all new construction of permanent facilities, whether on public or private land, would be funded by the government.

According to CEO John Furlong, VANOC "started our venue construction as early as possible". Construction on Cypress Mountain, the first new competition venue to be completed, began in March 2006 and was completed only eight months later, three years ahead of the start of the Games. By December 2007, all three competition venues at Whistler were completed and open for training and testing. Final construction was completed in February 2009, and sporting events were scheduled at the venues to ensure that they would be adequately tested before hosting the Olympic events. In total, six new competition venues were constructed: Cypress Mountain, Richmond Olympic Oval, UBC Thunderbird Arena, Vancouver Olympic/Paralympic Centre, Whistler Olympic Park, and The Whistler Sliding Centre.

The Whistler Sliding Centre was promoted as being one of the fastest sliding tracks in the world, which caused a number of concerns about safety. On February 12, 2010, hours before the opening ceremony, Georgian luger Nodar Kumaritashvili suffered a fatal crash during a training run when he was thrown off his sled and collided with a steel pole. He was travelling 143.3 km/h (89.0 mph) at the time. His accident came after a series of incidents in the week and reignited concerns about the track's safety. Investigations were conducted the same day, concluding that the accident was not caused by deficiencies in the track. As a preventive measure, an extra 100 ft (30 m) of wall was added after the end of Turn 16, and the ice profile was changed.

== Competition venues ==
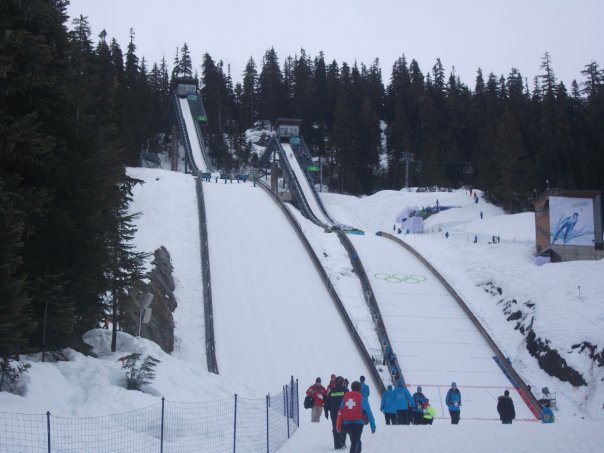
Whistler Olympic Park ski jumps at Callaghan Valley

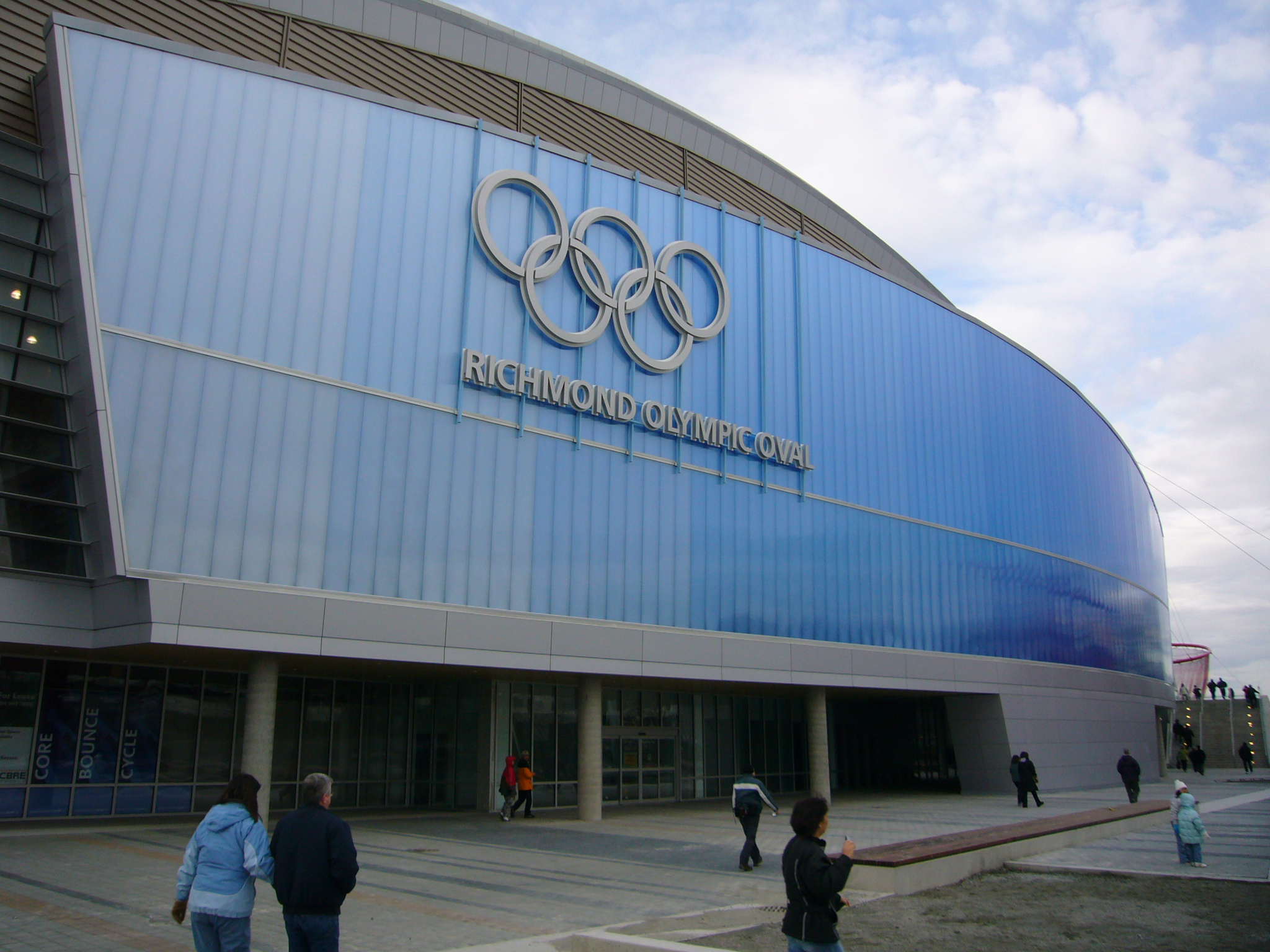
The Richmond Olympic Oval

The largest competition venue was Canada Hockey Place, with a capacity of just under 19,000 spectators. For the first time, Olympic games were played on a narrower NHL-sized ice rink, measuring 61 by 26 metres (200 ft × 85 ft), instead of the international size of 61 m × 30 m (200 ft × 98 ft). This change saved an expected $10 million (CAD) in construction costs, and allowed more spectators to attend games. This arena, as well as the Pacific Coliseum (the second-largest venue used for the 2010 Olympics), was pre-existing and required minimal renovation in preparation for the Olympics. Of the newly constructed venues for the Games, the Whistler Sliding Centre was the largest, with space for 12,000 spectators to observe the luge, skeleton and bobsled events. Three venues used in the Games were outside Vancouver and Whistler: Cypress Mountain in West Vancouver, the Richmond Olympic Oval in Richmond, and UBC Doug Mitchell Thunderbird Sports Centre on the UBC Vancouver campus.

Venue	Location	Sports	Capacity	Ref.
Canada Hockey Place (Note: Canada Hockey Place was normally known as General Motors Place at the time of the Olympics, but because corporate sponsorship is not allowed for an Olympic venue, it was renamed for the duration of the games.)	Vancouver	Ice hockey (final)	18,630	
Cypress Mountain	West Vancouver	Freestyle skiing, snowboarding	8,000	
Pacific Coliseum	Vancouver	Figure skating, short track speed skating	14,239	
Richmond Olympic Oval	Richmond	Speed skating	8,000	
UBC Doug Mitchell Thunderbird Sports Centre	UBC Vancouver	Ice hockey	7,200	
Vancouver Olympic/Paralympic Centre	Vancouver	Curling	6,000	
Whistler Creekside	Whistler	Alpine skiing	7,600	
Whistler Olympic Park	Whistler	Biathlon, cross-country skiing, Nordic combined, ski jumping	6,000	
Whistler Sliding Centre	Whistler	Bobsleigh, luge, skeleton	12,000	

== Non-competition venues ==
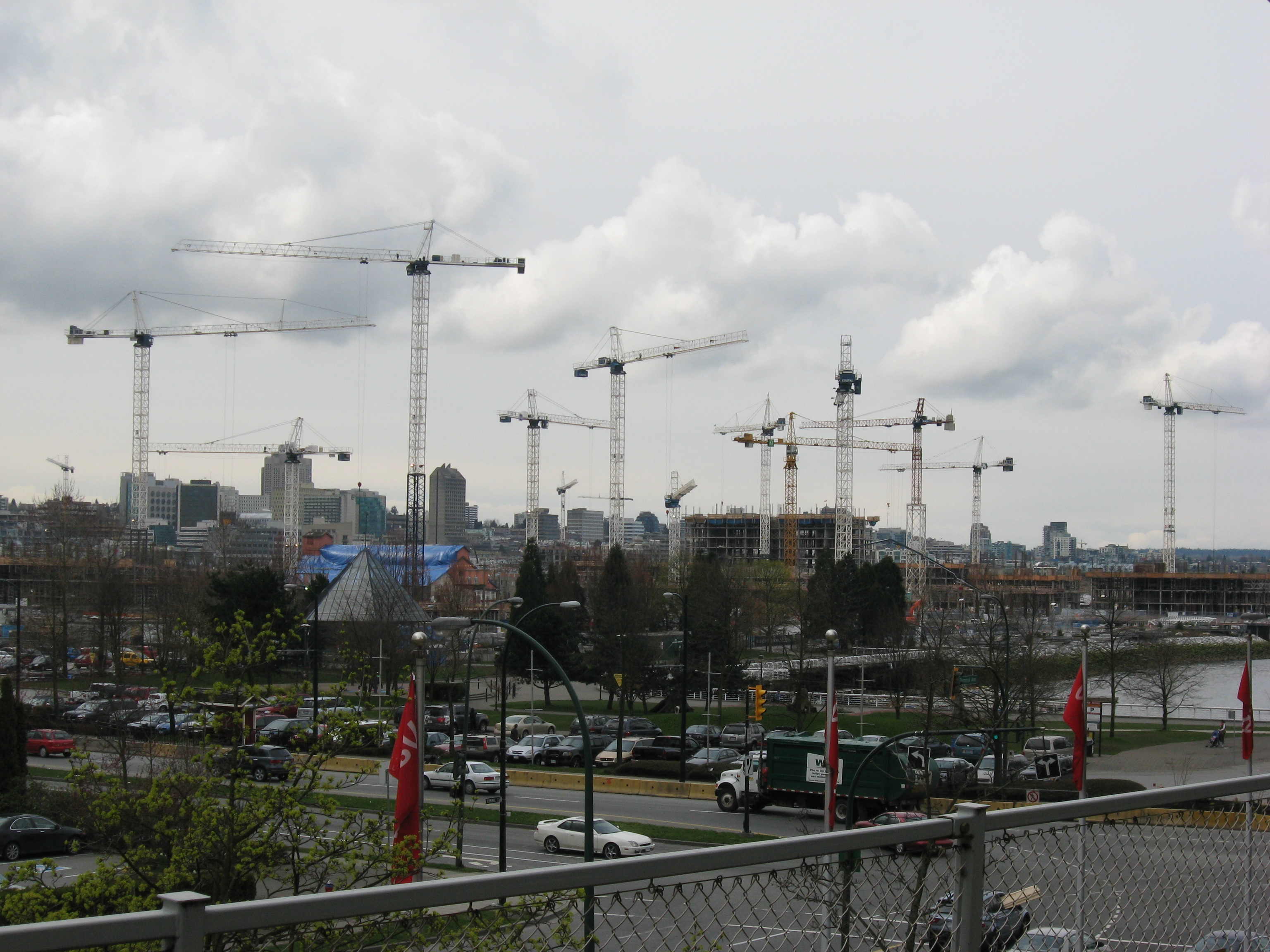
The Olympic Village being constructed on the southeastern shore of False Creek near downtown Vancouver

Because of the significant distance between Vancouver and Whistler, Olympic Villages and media facilities were constructed in both locations. In addition, while medals ceremonies for the events held in Vancouver took place at the pre-existing BC Place, an additional venue was constructed in Whistler to award medals there. Because BC Place is an indoor stadium, the Olympic torch cauldron, which was lit in the middle of the stadium during the opening ceremony, could not be left there because of safety concerns. A permanent "external cauldron" was erected at Jack Poole Plaza on the Coal Harbour waterfront. It was fenced and unavailable to the public during the Olympics due to its proximity to the Main Media Centre.

Venue	Location	Purpose	Ref.
BC Place	Vancouver	Opening and closing ceremonies	
Main Media Centre	Vancouver	Media centre	
Vancouver Olympic Village	Vancouver	Olympic Village	
Whistler Media Centre	Whistler	Media centre	
Whistler Olympic and Paralympic Village	Whistler	Olympic Village	
Whistler Olympic Celebration Plaza	Whistler	Ceremonies and presentations	
