= Google Street View in Israel =

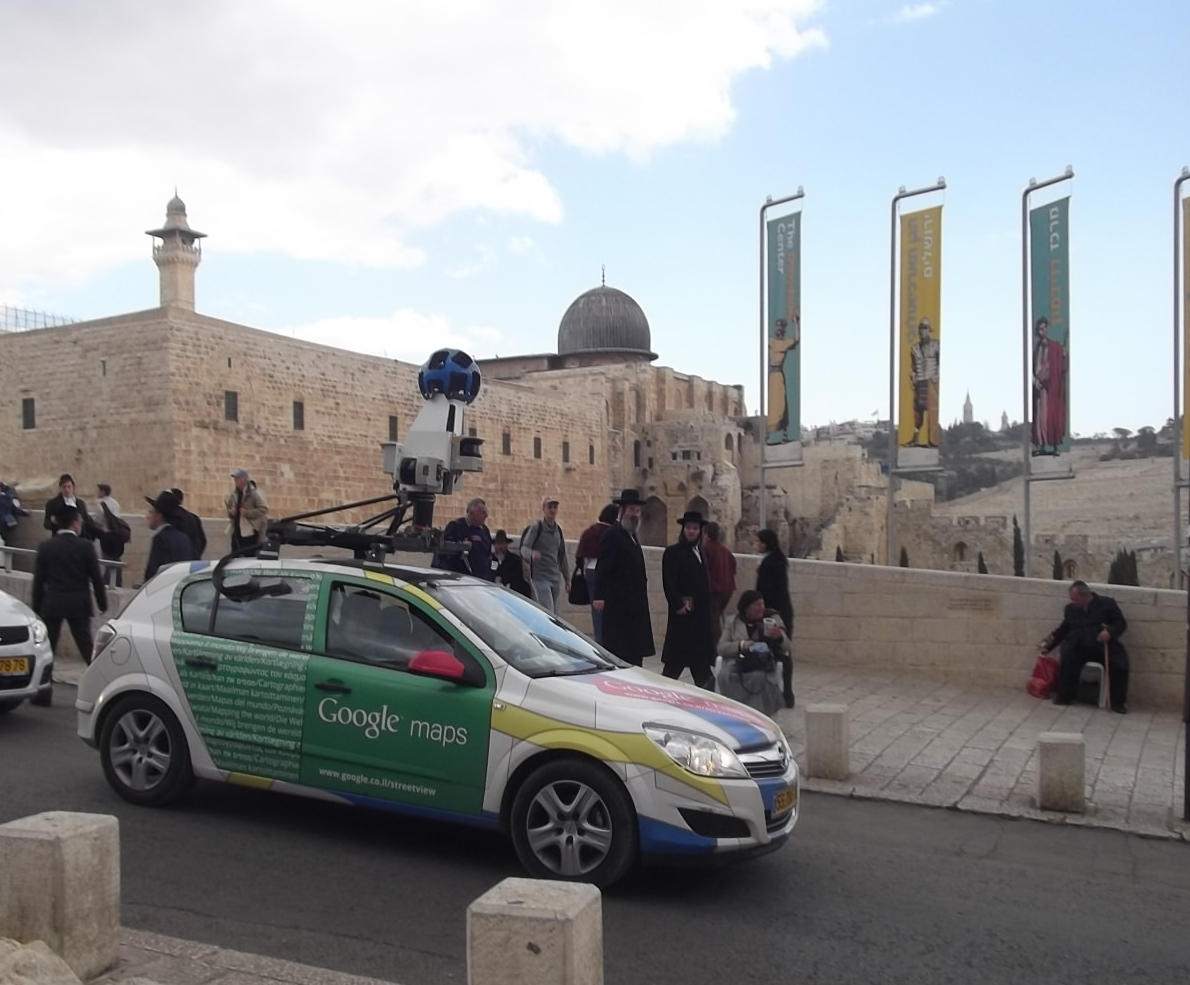
Google Car in Jerusalem

Google Street View started in Israel in April 2012. Israel was the first country in the Middle East to see non-museum Street View. First, on April 3, the interior of the Israel Museum was introduced. Then on April 19, three days ahead of the planned formal launch, Jerusalem and the country's two largest cities, Tel Aviv, and Haifa, along with a number of other landmarks, came public. On January 16, 2013, dozens of cities and towns around Israel, along with some road connections, were added. While seen as a boost to tourism in the country, the feature has also brought up concerns that it could aid terrorists, which have been addressed. The imagery even offers views of some contested sites.

In April 2015, Google started to take photos of Israel National Trail with a person carrying Google Street View camera called "Trekker", it took 10 weeks of hiking to finish the trail. The trail was published in street view on January 24, 2016.

== Background ==
When Street View was originally considered for Israel in 2011, multiple concerns arose, particularly with security, since Israel has had a long history of terrorist attacks. US law already restricts the resolution of satellite imagery taken of several countries, including Israel, for the protection of security of those countries. Israeli officials authorized Street View after three months of negotiations to define conditions to protect privacy. Consideration favoring Street View was that it would provide a boost to the economy by boosting tourism.

The Israeli government has permitted Street View to be in the country provided the following conditions have been met:

- Allowing any court cases related to Street View to take place in Israeli courts
- Google will not challenge Israeli law
- Google provides a method for users to request images be blurred or removed
- Google must inform the public in advance of its planned routes.
- Images would not reveal license plate numbers or home addresses and would obscure the faces of people on streets

The Israeli Intelligence Minister refused to divulge details in the final security arrangement that was made.

Filming of Street View in Israel began in September 2011. This included the use of tricycles to film areas of the Old City and other paths not accessible by motor vehicles.

In July 2022, Google started taking pictures again with gen 4 to be released in March of this year.

== Issues ==
There was much controversy surrounding bringing Street View to Israel. The main one was the fear that terrorists could use the feature to plan attacks. Palestinian militants have previously admitted to using Google Maps to help plan attacks.

A public poll found that 70% of Israelis support Street View.

Google Israel CEO Meir Brand stated that the areas that the filming was intended to take place on were not politically motivated, the areas that would be photographed would be accessible to the public, and that there would be sensitivity to cultural and security needs.

Tel Aviv mayor Ron Huldai does not see Street View as a security concern, stating that numerous terrorist attacks have already occurred without the aid of Street View, and therefore, Street View is not needed as a terrorist tool.

Still, Israeli Street View has faced some opposition. Mordechai Kedar, a former member of Israeli intelligence, believes militants will use street view to help plan attacks.

Military intelligence expert Ron Ben Yishai expressed his discomfort in the service to CNN reporters. He stated that it allows terrorists to use the tool to study their intended target in detail, which could include his own home.

Google was criticized by Ultra-Orthodox Jews for filming that took place on the holy day of Rosh Hashanah, and subsequently agreed not to engage in filming on future Jewish holy days or to use the images of Ultra-Orthodox Jews that were captured on Rosh Hashanah.

The images taken have revealed political tensions in the region. For example, right-wing activist Aryeh King, who supports Israeli development in East Jerusalem, was filmed standing with his trademark scooter in front of his East Jerusalem home that he won the rights to in court.

Some Israelis complained that Street View revealed a secret military base in Tel Aviv, but the Israeli Defense Force stated that the base was not secret and that everything was fine.

A month after Street View images were released to the public, it was revealed that military intelligence monitored the Street View project. The military determined whether Google's crew could enter off-limits or restricted access areas that required pre-screening.

=== Filming in the West Bank ===
One of the concerns that has been brought up has been the filming of streets in Israeli-occupied territories in the West Bank. Drivers told the public they were forbidden to disclose their destinations or to enter illegal outposts. Google had no plans to provide drivers with fortified cars to protect them from rock throwing or other similar attacks.

Google has stated that it intends to provide the Street View service in as many countries as possible, including those in the Middle East.

In October 2012, cars were spotted in the town of Kiryat Arba. Google has stated its intentions to film many Israeli settlements and cities in the West Bank.
