= Google Street View in Antarctica =

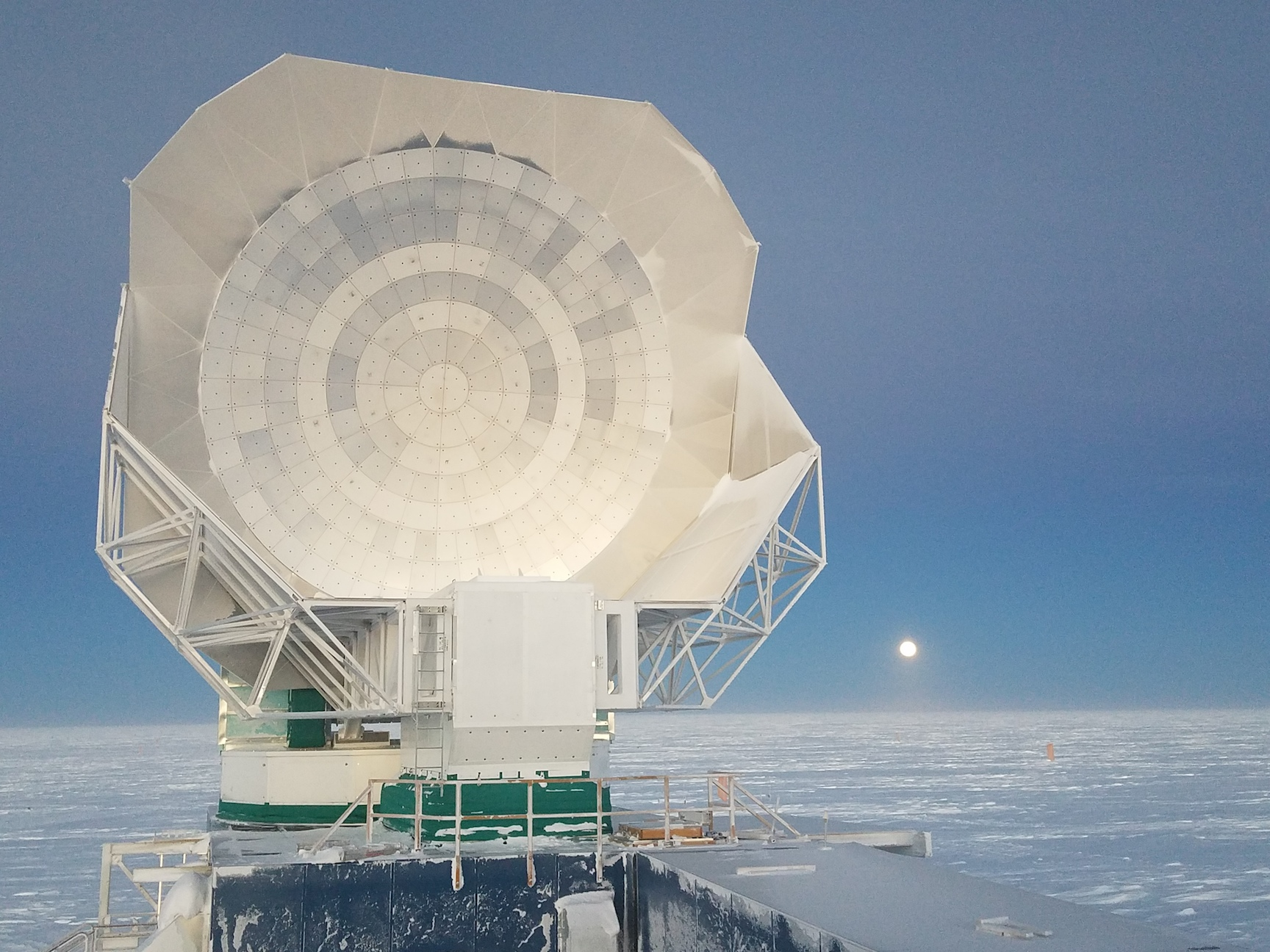
The South Pole Telescope (pictured in 2018), one of the locations in the continent available on Google Street View

Starting in 2010, multiple locations of Antarctica have been uploaded on Google Street View. Two images were initially uploaded that year of the Half Moon Island. Two years later, the site collaborated with the Polar Geospatial Center at the University of Minnesota and the New Zealand Antarctic Heritage Trust to take panoramic images of landmarks such as Shackleton's Hut and Scott's Hut.

Other images of sites such as the Beacon Valley were added the following year. Google Street View subsequently released a virtual tour of the South Pole Telescope under a collaboration with the University of Melbourne, and images of King George Island were uploaded in 2020 by a personal project headed by brothers Nicolás and Santiago Bianchi.

== Background ==
Google Street View is a technology featured in Google Maps and Google Earth that provides interactive panoramas from positions along many streets in the world. It was launched in 2007 in five cities in the United States, and continues to capture images in countries all over the world for the site.

== Expansion in Antarctica ==
The Geo Team for Google Street View wanted to "challenge" themselves to record more remote locations. As a result, alongside Brazil and Ireland, coverage for Antarctica on Google Street View was announced by Google on September 30, 2010 through a blog post by Brian McClendon, the vice president of engineering at Google Earth and Maps. It was the last continent to be added to the function. Two images were taken of the Half Moon Island in the South Shetland Islands in Antarctica during a visit by McClendon and his wife were added at the time; one image with chinstrap penguins and one image showing the island's coast.

In 2012, as part of Google Maps' World Wonders project, they collaborated with the Polar Geospatial Center at the University of Minnesota and the New Zealand Antarctic Heritage Trust to take panoramic views of select locations in Antarctica using a fish eye lens for the site. The captures included Cape Royds' penguin rookery, the South Pole Telescope, Shackleton's Hut, Scott's Hut, and the Ceremonial South Pole. Alex Starns, a worker on the project, stated that the reason they started the project was to make information regarding Antarctica be accessible to other remote locations. The following year, Google Street View released four new captures of locations in the continent, including the Arena Valley, Beacon Valley, Hidden Valley, and Camp Royds.

In a collaboration with the University of Melbourne, Google Street View released a virtual tour of the South Pole Telescope in 2014. It includes the telescope itself and other surrounding telescopes in the Dark Sector of the Amundsen–Scott South Pole Station. Later on, users were allowed to submit their own photos to the site. With support from the Uruguayan Antarctic Institute and sponsorships such as GoPro, brothers Nicolás and Santiago Bianchi had initially planned to take images of King George Island for the feature. Although they had to initially cancel due to the COVID-19 pandemic, the project took place the following year during one of the Institute's trips to dispose of trash and deliver supplies. Five gigabytes of image data were generated per kilometer, and the images were uploaded with the approval of Google Street View.
