= Google Street View in the United States =

Google cameras on cars in the US

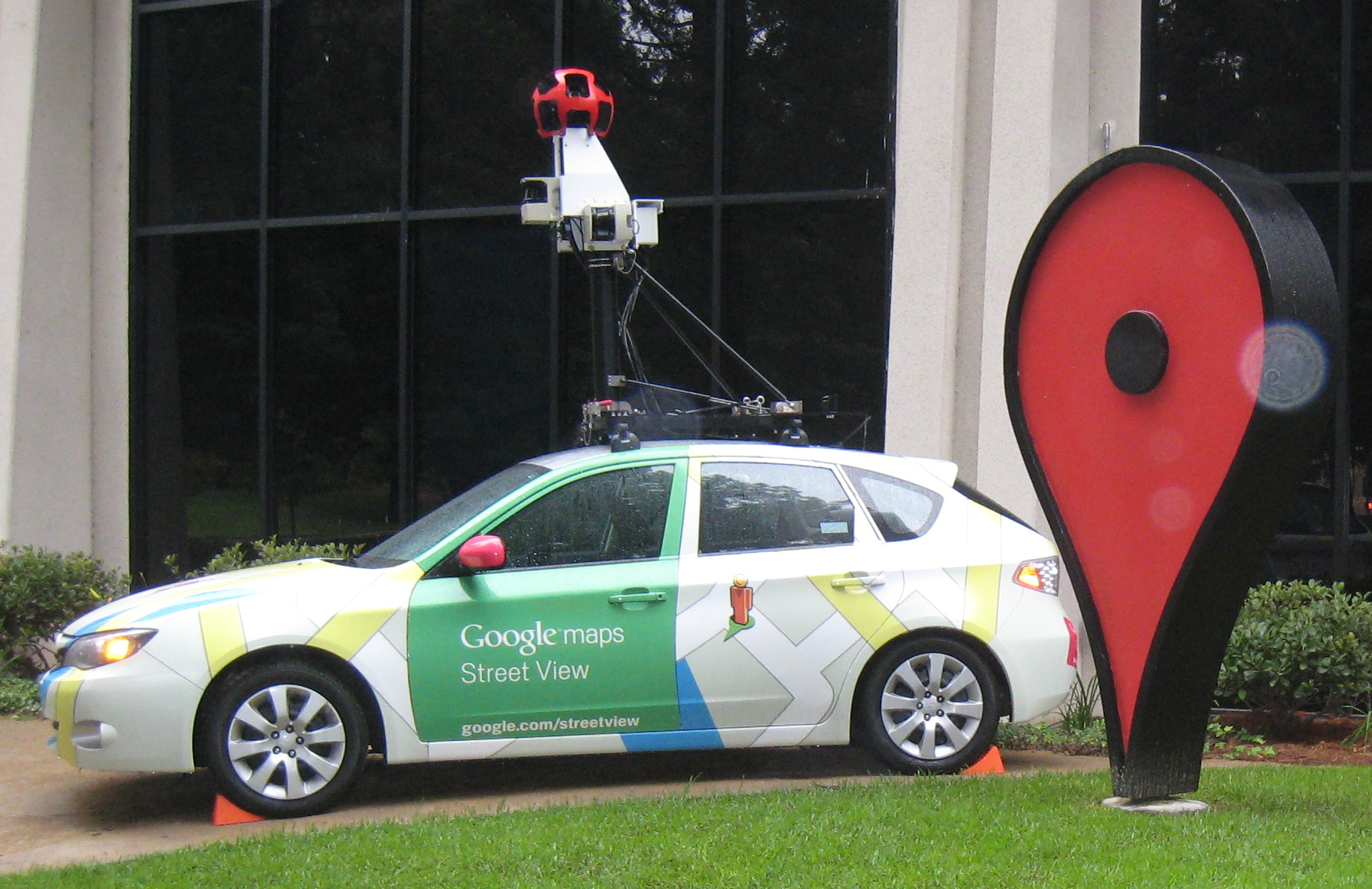
A Google Maps Camera Car showcased on Google campus in Mountain View, California in November 2010.

The United States was the first country to have Google Street View images and was the only country with images for over a year following introduction of the service on May 25, 2007. Early on, most locations had a limited number of views, usually constrained to the city limits and only including major streets, and they only showed the buildings up to a certain height. A very limited number of suburbs or other nearby cities were included.

After the first few sets of introductions, image collections from cities added were more detailed, often including every side street, especially in areas closer to the center of the city. More suburbs and other nearby cities were included.

The coverage of various cities has in many cases, subsequently been enlarged and improved, but not necessarily on the same date as new cities have been added. Improvements have included the additions of streets in neighborhoods where previously only main roads had been covered, expansions to more suburbs, and views to the sky where previously only views to a certain height were provided.

Initially when a group of cities were added, only those cities and their own suburbs would be a part of the image collection. However June 10, 2008 introductions also included cities in covered areas without camera icons and isolated from any other camera icons. Many more cities were added without icons on August 4, when the only U.S. city added with an icon was New Orleans.

On November 9, 2009, parts of Hawaii were added, and coverage of the United States was also further expanded, although some key areas had yet to be added. With the addition of Hawaii, all fifty states are now represented in Street View.

On July 2, 2013, high-definition images, at least 99% of which has been taken since early 2011, were added to major portions of all fifty states, including those that have had no HD images up to that point.

== Timeline of introductions ==
Note: Bold indicates locations available in newer 'high quality' (or high definition) view. Italic bold indicates locations partially available in high quality view. Normal text indicates locations only available in older low-resolution view.

| Date | Major locations added |
|---|---|
| Friday, May 25, 2007 | **San Francisco**, **Las Vegas**, **Denver**, **Miami**, **New York City** |
| Tuesday, August 7, 2007 | **Los Angeles**, **San Diego**, **Houston**, **Orlando** |
| Tuesday, October 9, 2007 | **Portland**, **Phoenix**, **Tucson**, **Chicago**, **Pittsburgh**, **Philadelphia** |
| Monday, December 10, 2007 | **Dallas**, **Minneapolis**, **Indianapolis**, **Detroit**, **Providence**, **Boston** |
| Tuesday, February 12, 2008 | **Juneau**, **Boise**, **Salt Lake City**, **San Antonio**, **Kansas City**, **Milwaukee**, **Raleigh**, **Albany**, **Manchester** |
| Thursday, March 27, 2008 | **Anchorage**, **Fairbanks**, **Spokane**, **Yosemite National Park**, **Albuquerque**, **Austin**, **Little Rock**, **Rockford**, **Madison**, **Nashville**, **Cleveland**, **Tampa**, **Richmond** |
| Tuesday, June 10, 2008 | **Sacramento**, **Fresno**, **Oklahoma City**, **St. Louis**, **Jackson**, **Louisville**, **Atlanta**, **Columbus**, **Jacksonville**, **Columbia**, **Charlotte**, **Buffalo**, **Virginia Beach**, **Yellowstone National Park** |
| Monday, August 4, 2008 | **New Orleans, Baton Rouge and more rural areas** |
| Tuesday, November 4, 2008 | **Seattle, Washington, D.C., Baltimore and more rural areas** |
| Tuesday, December 9, 2008 | **More locations in United States** |
| Wednesday, March 18, 2009 | **More locations in United States** |
| Tuesday, August 18, 2009 | **Legoland California**, **Mazda Raceway Laguna Seca**, **San Diego State University**, **Thunderhill Raceway Park** |
| Wednesday, October 7, 2009 | **More locations in United States** |
| Wednesday, December 2, 2009 | **SeaWorld (for** **Orlando,** **San Antonio, and** **San Diego),** **Boston University,** **Hersheypark,** **Universal Studios Hollywood,** **Universal Studios Florida** |
| Thursday, January 21, 2010 | **San Diego Zoo**, **Sesame Place**, **Busch Gardens**, **Water Country USA**, **Pennsylvania State University**, **University of Pennsylvania**, **Detroit Zoo**, **Rochester Institute of Technology**, **Faneuil Hall Marketplace**, **Boulder Creek Path** |
| Tuesday, February 9, 2010 | **More locations in Alaska as Kenai, Homer, Valdez, Ketchikan, Petersburg, road to Circle, Deadhorse and other places** |
| Tuesday, February 1, 2011 | **Freer Gallery of Art**, **The Frick Collection**, **The Metropolitan Museum of Art**, **The Museum of Modern Art** |
| Monday, February 28, 2011 | **Balboa Park** |
| Thursday, November 8, 2011 | **Selected buildings** |
| Monday, September 22, 2014 | **Unincorporated territories of the United States including:** **Hagåtña and more locations in Guam**; **Capitol Hill, Saipan, Garapan and more locations in the Northern Mariana Islands** |
| Thursday, September 1, 2016 | **Frederiksted, Buccaneer Golf Course, etc. on Saint Croix** **and more locations in U.S. Virgin Islands** |
| Wednesday, December 14, 2016 | **Major roads. Most streets in Caguaz, Ponce, Mayaguez, San Juan** **and more locations in Puerto Rico** |

== Areas included ==
| State or territory | Major cities/areas |
|---|---|
| Alabama | Alabaster, Albertville, Alexander City, Anniston, Athens, Atmore, Auburn, Bessemer, Birmingham, Calera, Center Point, Chelsea, Cullman, Daphne, Decatur, Dothan, Enterprise, Eufaula, Fairfield, Fairhope, Florence, Foley, Forestdale, Fort Payne, Gadsden, Gardendale, Hartselle, Helena, Homewood, Hoover, Hueytown, Huntsville, Irondale, Jacksonville, Jasper, Leeds, Madison, Millbrook, Mobile, Montgomery, Moody, Mountain Brook, Muscle Shoals, Northport, Opelika, Oxford, Ozark, Pelham, Pell City, Phenix City, Pleasant Grove, Prattville, Prichard, Saks, Saraland, Scottsboro, Selma, Sylacauga, Talladega, Tillman's Corner, Troy, Trussville, Tuscaloosa, Vestavia Hills |
| Alaska | Anchorage, College, Fairbanks, Galena, Haines, Juneau, Ketchikan, Knik-Fairview, Nome, Petersburg, Prudhoe Bay, Skagway, Unalakleet |
| American Samoa | Major roads |
| Arizona | Anthem, Apache Junction, Avondale, Buckeye, Bullhead City, Camp Verde, Casa Grande, Casas Adobes, Catalina Foothills, Chandler, Chino Valley, Coolidge, Cottonwood, Douglas, Drexel Heights, El Mirage, Eloy, Flagstaff, Florence, Flowing Wells, Fort Mohave, Fortuna Foothills, Fountain Hills, Gilbert, Glendale, Gold Canyon, Goodyear, Grand Canyon National Park, Green Valley, Kingman, Lake Havasu City, Marana, Maricopa, Mesa, New Kingman-Butler, New River, Nogales, Oro Valley, Paradise Valley, Payson, Peoria, Phoenix, Prescott, Prescott Valley, Queen Creek, Rio Rico, Sahuarita, San Luis, San Tan Valley, Scottsdale, Sedona, Show Low, Sierra Vista, Sierra Vista Southeast, Somerton, Sun City, Sun City West, Sun Lakes, Surprise, Tanque Verde, Tempe, Tombstone, Tucson, Tucson Estates, Vail, Verde Village, Yuma |
| Arkansas | Arkadelphia, Batesville, Bella Vista, Benton, Bentonville, Blytheville, Bryant, Cabot, Camden, Conway, El Dorado, Fayetteville, Forrest City, Fort Smith, Harrison, Helena-West Helena, Hope, Hot Springs, Hot Springs Village, Jacksonville, Jonesboro, Little Rock, Magnolia, Malvern, Marion, Maumelle, Mountain Home, North Little Rock, Paragould, Pine Bluff, Rogers, Russellville, Searcy, Sherwood, Siloam Springs, Springdale, Texarkana, Van Buren, West Memphis |
| California | Adelanto, Agoura Hills, Alameda, Alamo, Albany, Alhambra, Aliso Viejo, Alpine, Altadena, Alum Rock, American Canyon, Anaheim, Antelope, Antioch, Apple Valley, Arcadia, Arcata, Arden-Arcade, Arroyo Grande, Artesia, Arvin, Ashland, Atascadero, Atwater, Auburn, Avenal, Avocado Heights, Azusa, Bakersfield, Baldwin Park, Banning, Barstow, Bay Point, Beaumont, Bell, Bell Gardens, Bellflower, Belmont, Benicia, Berkeley, Beverly Hills, Big Bear City, Bloomington, Blythe, Bonita, Bostonia, Brawley, Brea, Brentwood, Buena Park, Burbank, Burlingame, Calabasas, Calexico, California City, Camarillo, Cameron Park, Campbell, Camp Pendleton South, Canyon Lake, Carlsbad, Carmichael, Carpinteria, Carson, Casa de Oro-Mount Helix, Castaic, Castro Valley, Cathedral City, Ceres, Cerritos, Cherryland, Chico, Chino, Chino Hills, Chowchilla, Chula Vista, Citrus, Citrus Heights, Claremont, Clayton, Clearlake, Clovis, Coachella, Coalinga, Colton, Commerce, Compton, Concord, Corcoran, Corona, Coronado, Costa Mesa, Coto de Caza, Covina, Crestline, Cudahy, Culver City, Cupertino, Cypress, Daly City, Dana Point, Danville, Davis, Death Valley National Park, Del Aire, Delano, Delhi, Desert Hot Springs, Diamond Bar, Diamond Springs, Dinuba, Discovery Bay, Dixon, Downey, Duarte, Dublin, East Los Angeles, East Palo Alto, East Rancho Dominguez, East San Gabriel, Eastvale, El Cajon, El Centro, El Cerrito, El Dorado Hills, El Monte, El Paso de Robles, El Segundo, El Sobrante (Contra Costa), El Sobrante (Riverside), Elk Grove, Emeryville, Encinitas, Escondido, Eureka, Exeter, Fairfield, Fair Oaks, Fairview, Fallbrook, Farmersville, Fillmore, Florence-Graham, Florin, Folsom, Fontana, Foothill Farms, Fortuna, Foster City, Fountain Valley, Fremont, Fresno, Fullerton, Galt, Gardena, Garden Acres, Garden Grove, Gilroy, Glen Avon, Glendale, Glendora, Goleta, Grand Terrace, Granite Bay, Grass Valley, Greenfield, Grover Beach, Hacienda Heights, Half Moon Bay, Hanford, Hawaiian Gardens, Hawthorne, Hayward, Healdsburg, Hemet, Hercules, Hermosa Beach, Hesperia, Highland, Hillsborough, Hollister, Home Gardens, Huntington Beach, Huntington Park, Imperial, Imperial Beach, Indio, Inglewood, Irvine, Isla Vista, Joshua Tree National Park, Kerman, King City, Kingsburg, Kings Canyon National Park, La Cañada Flintridge, La Crescenta-Montrose, Ladera Ranch, Lafayette, Laguna Beach, Laguna Hills, Laguna Niguel, Laguna Woods, La Habra, Lake Arrowhead, Lake Elsinore, Lake Forest, Lake Los Angeles, Lakeland Village, Lakeside, Lakewood, La Mesa, La Mirada, Lamont, Lancaster, La Palma, La Presa, La Puente, La Quinta, La Riviera, Larkspur, Lathrop, La Verne, Lawndale, Lemon Grove, Lemon Hill, Lemoore, Lennox, Lincoln, Linda, Lindsay, Live Oak, Livermore, Livingston, Lodi, Loma Linda, Lomita, Lompoc, Long Beach, Los Alamitos, Los Altos, Los Angeles, Los Banos, Los Gatos, Los Osos, Lynwood, Madera, Magalia, Malibu, Manhattan Beach, Manteca, Marina, Martinez, Marysville, Maywood, McFarland, McKinleyville, Mecca, Mead Valley, Mendota, Menifee, Menlo Park, Merced, Mill Valley, Millbrae, Milpitas, Mira Loma, Mission Viejo, Modesto, Mojave National Preserve, Monrovia, Montclair, Montebello, Monterey, Monterey Park, Moorpark, Moraga, Moreno Valley, Morgan Hill, Morro Bay, Mountain View, Murrieta, Muscoy, Napa, National City, Newark, Newman, Newport Beach, Nipomo, Norco, North Auburn, North Fair Oaks, North Highlands, North Tustin, Norwalk, Novato, Oakdale, Oakland, Oakley, Oak Park, Oceanside, Oildale, Olivehurst, Ontario, Orange, Orangevale, Orcutt, Orinda, Oroville, Oxnard, Pacifica, Pacific Grove, Palmdale, Palm Desert, Palm Springs, Palo Alto, Palos Verdes Estates, Paradise, Paramount, Parkway, Parlier, Pasadena, Patterson, Pedley, Perris, Petaluma, Phelan, Pico Rivera, Piedmont, Pinole, Pittsburg, Placentia, Placerville, Pleasant Hill, Pleasanton, Pomona, Porterville, Port Hueneme, Poway, Prunedale, Quartz Hill, Ramona, Rancho Cordova, Rancho Cucamonga, Rancho Mirage, Rancho Palos Verdes, Rancho San Diego, Rancho Santa Margarita, Red Bluff, Redding, Redlands, Redondo Beach, Redwood City, Redwood National Park, Reedley, Rialto, Richmond, Ridgecrest, Rio Linda, Ripon, Riverbank, Riverside, Rocklin, Rohnert Park, Rosamond, Rosedale, Rosemead, Rosemont, Roseville, Rossmoor, Rowland Heights, Rubidoux, Sacramento, Salida, Salinas, San Anselmo, San Bernardino, San Bruno, San Carlos, San Clemente, San Diego, San Diego Country Estates, San Dimas, San Fernando, San Francisco, San Gabriel, Sanger, San Jacinto, San Jose, San Juan Capistrano, San Leandro, San Lorenzo, San Luis Obispo, San Marcos, San Marino, San Mateo, San Pablo, San Rafael, San Ramon, Santa Ana, Santa Barbara, Santa Clara, Santa Clarita, Santa Cruz, Santa Fe Springs, Santa Maria, Santa Monica, Santa Paula, Santa Rosa, Santee, Saratoga, Scotts Valley, Seal Beach, Seaside, Selma, Sequoia National Park, Shafter, Shasta Lake, Sierra Madre, Signal Hill, Simi Valley, Solana Beach, Soledad, Sonoma, South El Monte, South Gate, South Lake Tahoe, South Pasadena, South San Francisco, South San Jose Hills, South Whittier, Spring Valley, Stanford, Stanton, Stevenson Ranch, Stockton, Suisun City, Sunnyvale, Sun Village, Susanville, Tamalpais-Homestead Valley, Tehachapi, Temecula, Temescal Valley, Temple City, Thousand Oaks, Torrance, Tracy, Truckee, Tulare, Turlock, Tustin, Twentynine Palms, Ukiah, Union City, Upland, Vacaville, Valinda, Vallejo, Valle Vista, Ventura, Victorville, View Park-Windsor Hills, Vincent, Vineyard, Visalia, Vista, Walnut, Walnut Creek, Walnut Park, Wasco, Watsonville, West Carson, West Covina, West Hollywood, Westminster, Westmont, West Puente Valley, West Sacramento, West Whittier-Los Nietos, Whittier, Wildomar, Willowbrook, Windsor, Winter Gardens, Winton, Woodcrest, Woodland, Yorba Linda, Yosemite National Park, Yuba City, Yucaipa, Yucca Valley |
| Colorado | Arvada, Aspen, Aurora, Berkley, Black Forest, Boulder, Brighton, Broomfield, Cañon City, Castle Pines North, Castle Rock, Centennial, Cherry Creek, Cimarron Hills, Clifton, Colorado Springs, Columbine, Commerce City, Dakota Ridge, Denver, Durango, Edwards, Englewood, Erie, Evans, Federal Heights, Firestone, Fort Carson, Fort Collins, Fort Morgan, Fountain, Fruita, Glenwood Springs, Golden, Grand Junction, Greeley, Greenwood Village, Highlands Ranch, Idaho Springs, Ken Caryl, Lafayette, Lakewood, Littleton, Lone Tree, Longmont, Louisville, Loveland, Montrose, Northglenn, Parker, Pueblo, Pueblo West, Security-Widefield, Sherrelwood, Steamboat Springs, Sterling, Superior, The Pinery, Thornton, Welby, Westminster, Wheat Ridge, Windsor |
| Connecticut | Ansonia, Bridgeport, Bristol, Danbury, Darien, Derby, East Hartford, East Haven, Greenwich, Groton, Hartford, Manchester, Meriden, Middletown, Milford, Naugatuck, New Britain, New Haven, Newington, New London, North Haven, Norwalk, Norwich, Orange, Shelton, Stamford, Storrs, Stratford, Torrington, Trumbull, Wallingford Center, Waterbury, West Hartford, West Haven, Westport, Wethersfield, Willimantic, Windsor Locks |
| Delaware | Bear, Bethany Beach, Brookside, Dover, Georgetown, Glasgow, Harrington, Hockessin, Lewes, Middletown, Milford, Newark, New Castle, Pike Creek Valley, Rehoboth Beach, Seaford, Smyrna, Wilmington |
| District of Columbia | Washington |
| Florida | Alafaya, Altamonte Springs, Apollo Beach, Apopka, Atlantic Beach, Auburndale, Aventura, Azalea Park, Bartow, Bayonet Point, Bayshore Gardens, Bellair-Meadowbrook Terrace, Belle Glade, Bellview, Bloomingdale, Boca Raton, Bonita Springs, Boynton Beach, Bradenton, Brandon, Brent, Brownsville, Buenaventura Lakes, Callaway, Cape Canaveral, Cape Coral, Carrollwood, Casselberry, Cheval, Citrus Park, Clearwater, Clermont, Cocoa, Cocoa Beach, Coconut Creek, Conway, Cooper City, Coral Gables, Coral Springs, Coral Terrace, Country Club, Country Walk, Crestview, Cutler Bay, Cypress Lake, Dania Beach, Davie, Daytona Beach, DeBary, Deerfield Beach, DeLand, Delray Beach, Deltona, Destin, Doctor Phillips, Doral, Dry Tortugas, Dunedin, East Lake, East Lake-Orient Park, East Milton, Edgewater, Egypt Lake-Leto, Elfers, Englewood, Ensley, Estero, Eustis, Everglades National Park, Fairview Shores, Fellsmere, Fernandina Beach, Ferry Pass, Fish Hawk, Fleming Island, Florida City, Florida Ridge, Forest City, Fort Lauderdale, Fort Myers, Fort Pierce, Fort Walton Beach, Fontainebleau, Four Corners, Fruit Cove, Fruitville, Gainesville, Gibsonton, Gladeview, Glenvar Heights, Golden Gate, Golden Glades, Goldenrod, Gonzalez, Goulds, Greenacres, Green Cove Springs, Gulf Gate Estates, Gulfport, Haines City, Hallandale Beach, Hialeah, Hialeah Gardens, Highland City, Hobe Sound, Holiday, Holly Hill, Hollywood, Homestead, Homosassa Springs, Horizon West, Hudson, Hunter's Creek, Immokalee, Iona, Ives Estates, Jacksonville, Jacksonville Beach, Jasmine Estates, Jensen Beach, Jupiter, Jupiter Farms, Kendale Lakes, Kendall, Kendall West, Key Biscayne, Key Largo, Keystone, Key West, Kissimmee, Lady Lake, Lake Butler, Lake City, Lakeland, Lakeland Highlands, Lake Magdalene, Lake Mary, Lakeside, Lake Wales, Lakewood Park, Lake Worth, Land o' Lakes, Lantana, Largo, Lauderdale Lakes, Lauderhill, Lealman, Leesburg, Lehigh Acres, Leisure City, Lighthouse Point, Lockhart, Longwood, Lutz, Lynn Haven, Maitland, Mango, Marco Island, Margate, Meadow Woods, Melbourne, Merritt Island, Miami, Miami Beach, Miami Gardens, Miami Lakes, Miami Shores, Miami Springs, Middleburg, Midway (Santa Rosa), Miramar, Mount Dora, Myrtle Grove, Naples, Navarre, New Port Richey, New Port Richey East, New Smyrna Beach, Niceville, Northdale, North Fort Myers, North Lauderdale, North Miami, North Miami Beach, North Palm Beach, North Port, Oakland Park, OakLeaf Plantation, Oak Ridge, Ocala, Ocoee, Ojus, Oldsmar, Olympia Heights, Opa-locka, Orange City, Orange Park, Orlando, Ormond Beach, Oviedo, Pace, Palatka, Palm Bay, Palm Beach Gardens, Palm City, Palm Coast, Palmetto, Palmetto Bay, Palmetto Estates, Palm Harbor, Palm River-Clair-Mel, Palm Springs, Palm Valley, Panama City, Panama City Beach, Parkland, Pembroke Pines, Pensacola, Pine Castle, Pinecrest, Pine Hills, Pinellas Park, Pinewood, Plantation, Plant City, Poinciana, Pompano Beach, Port Charlotte, Port Orange, Port St. John, Port St. Lucie, Port Salerno, Princeton, Punta Gorda, Richmond West, Riverview, Riviera Beach, Rockledge, Royal Palm Beach, Ruskin, Safety Harbor, St. Augustine, St. Cloud, St. Petersburg, San Carlos Park, Sanford, Sarasota, Sarasota Springs, Satellite Beach, Sebastian, Sebring, Seminole, Shady Hills, South Bradenton, Southchase, South Daytona, South Miami, South Miami Heights, South Venice, Spring Hill, Stuart, Sun City Center, Sunny Isles Beach, Sunrise, Sunset, Sweetwater, Tallahassee, Tamarac, Tamiami, Tampa, Tarpon Springs, Tavares, Temple Terrace, The Acreage, The Crossings, The Hammocks, The Villages, Thonotosassa, Three Lakes, Titusville, Town 'n' Country, Trinity, University (Hillsborough), University (Orange), University Park, Upper Grand Lagoon, Valrico, Venice, Vero Beach, Vero Beach South, Viera East, Villas, Warrington, Wekiva Springs, Wellington, Wesley Chapel, Westchase, Westchester, West Lealman, West Little River, West Melbourne, Weston, West Palm Beach, West Park, West Pensacola, Westwood Lakes, Wilton Manors, Winter Garden, Winter Haven, Winter Park, Winter Springs, World Golf Village, Wright, Yulee, Zephyrhills |
| Georgia | Acworth, Albany, Alpharetta, Americus, Athens, Atlanta, Augusta, Bainbridge, Belvedere Park, Brunswick, Buford, Calhoun, Candler-McAfee, Canton, Carrollton, Cartersville, College Park, Columbus, Conyers, Cordele, Covington, Cusseta-Chattahoochee County, Dallas, Dalton, Decatur, Douglas, Douglasville, Druid Hills, Dublin, Duluth, Dunwoody, East Point, Evans, Fairburn, Fayetteville, Forest Park, Gainesville, Georgetown, Griffin, Grovetown, Hinesville, Jesup, Johns Creek, Kennesaw, Kingsland, La Grange, Lawrenceville, Lilburn, Lithia Springs, Loganville, Mableton, Macon, Marietta, Martinez, McDonough, Milledgeville, Milton, Monroe, Moultrie, Mountain Park, Newnan, North Atlanta, North Decatur, North Druid Hills, Peachtree City, Perry, Pooler, Powder Springs, Redan, Riverdale, Rome, Roswell, St. Marys, St. Simons, Sandy Springs, Savannah, Scottdale, Smyrna, Snellville, Statesboro, Stockbridge, Sugar Hill, Suwanee, Thomasville, Tifton, Tucker, Union City, Valdosta, Vidalia, Villa Rica, Warner Robins, Waycross, Wilmington Island, Winder, Woodstock |
| Guam | Hagåtña and more locations in Guam |
| Hawaii | Most of the Big Island, Kauai, Lanai, Maui, Molokai, Oʻahu, and Tern Island. Main cities and towns: Ewa Beach, Ewa Gentry, Halawa, Hawaiian Paradise Park, Hilo, Honolulu, Kahului, Kailua (Hawaii), Kailua (Honolulu), Kaneohe, Kapaa, Kapolei, Kihei, Lahaina, Makakilo, Mililani Mauka, Mililani Town, Nanakuli, Pearl City, Royal Kunia, Schofield Barracks, Wahiawa, Waianae, Wailuku, Waimalu, Waipahu, Waipio |
| Idaho | Ammon, Blackfoot, Boise, Burley, Caldwell, Chubbuck, Coeur d'Alene, Eagle, Garden City, Hayden, Horseshoe Bend, Idaho City, Idaho Falls, Jerome, Kuna, Lewiston, Meridian, Moscow, Mountain Home, Murphy, Nampa, Pocatello, Post Falls, Rexburg, Sandpoint, Twin Falls |
| Illinois | Addison, Algonquin, Alsip, Alton, Antioch, Arlington Heights, Aurora, Barrington, Bartlett, Batavia, Beach Park, Belleville, Bellwood, Belvidere, Bensenville, Berwyn, Bloomingdale, Bloomington, Blue Island, Bolingbrook, Bourbonnais, Bradley, Bridgeview, Brookfield, Brookport, Buffalo Grove, Burbank, Burr Ridge, Cahokia, Cairo, Calumet City, Campton Hills, Canton, Carbondale, Carol Stream, Carpentersville, Cary, Centralia, Champaign, Channahon, Charleston, Chatham, Chicago, Chicago Heights, Chicago Ridge, Cicero, Collinsville, Country Club Hills, Crest Hill, Crestwood, Crystal Lake, Danville, Darien, Decatur, Deerfield, De Kalb, Des Plaines, Dixon, Dolton, Downers Grove, East Moline, East Peoria, East St. Louis, Edwardsville, Effingham, Elgin, Elk Grove Village, Elmhurst, Elmwood Park, Evanston, Evergreen Park, Fairview Heights, Forest Park, Fox Lake, Frankfort, Franklin Park, Freeport, Gages Lake, Galesburg, Geneva, Glen Carbon, Glen Ellyn, Glendale Heights, Glenview, Godfrey, Granite City, Grayslake, Gurnee, Hanover Park, Harvey, Hazel Crest, Herrin, Hickory Hills, Highland Park, Hinsdale, Hoffman Estates, Homer Glen, Homewood, Huntley, Jacksonville, Joliet, Justice, Kankakee, Kewanee, La Grange, La Grange Park, Lake Forest, Lake in the Hills, Lake Zurich, Lansing, Lemont, Libertyville, Lincoln, Lincolnwood, Lindenhurst, Lisle, Lockport, Lombard, Loves Park, Lyons, Machesney Park, Macomb, Marion, Markham, Matteson, Mattoon, Maywood, McHenry, Melrose Park, Metropolis, Midlothian, Minooka, Mokena, Moline, Montgomery, Morris, Morton, Morton Grove, Mount Prospect, Mount Vernon, Mundelein, Naperville, New Lenox, Niles, Normal, Norridge, North Aurora, Northbrook, North Chicago, Northlake, Oak Forest, Oak Lawn, Oak Park, O'Fallon, Orland Park, Oswego, Ottawa, Palatine, Palos Heights, Palos Hills, Park Forest, Park Ridge, Pekin, Peoria, Peru, Plainfield, Plano, Polo, Pontiac, Prospect Heights, Quincy, Rantoul, Richton Park, Riverdale, River Forest, River Grove, Rochester, Rockford, Rock Island, Rolling Meadows, Romeoville, Roscoe, Roselle, Round Lake, Round Lake Beach, St. Charles, Sauk Village, Schaumburg, Schiller Park, Old Shawneetown, Shawneetown, Sherman, Shiloh, Shorewood, Skokie, South Elgin, South Holland, Springfield, Sterling, Streamwood, Streator, Summit, Swansea, Sycamore, Taylorville, Tinley Park, Urbana, Vernon Hills, Villa Park, Warrenville, Washington, Wauconda, Waukegan, Westchester, West Chicago, Western Springs, Westmont, Wheaton, Wheeling, Wilmette, Winnetka, Wood Dale, Woodridge, Wood River, Woodstock, Worth, Yorkville, Zion |
| Indiana | Anderson, Auburn, Avon, Bedford, Beech Grove, Bloomington, Brownsburg, Carmel, Cedar Lake, Chesterton, Clarksville, Columbus, Connersville, Crawfordsville, Crown Point, Dyer, East Chicago, Elkhart, Evansville, Fishers, Fort Wayne, Frankfort, Franklin, Gary, Goshen, Granger, Greencastle, Greenfield, Greensburg, Greenwood, Griffith, Hammond, Highland, Hobart, Huntington, Indianapolis, Jasper, Jeffersonville, Kokomo, Lafayette, Lake Station, La Porte, Lawrence, Lebanon, Logansport, Madison, Marion, Martinsville, Merrillville, Michigan City, Mishawaka, Muncie, Munster, New Albany, New Castle, New Haven, Noblesville, Peru, Plainfield, Plymouth, Portage, Purdue University, Richmond, St. John, Schererville, Seymour, Shelbyville, South Bend, Speedway, Terre Haute, Valparaiso, Vincennes, Wabash, Warsaw, Washington, Westfield, West Lafayette, Zionsville |
| Iowa | Altoona, Ames, Ankeny, Bettendorf, Boone, Burlington, Carroll, Cedar Falls, Cedar Rapids, Clinton, Clive, Coralville, Council Bluffs, Davenport, Des Moines, Dubuque, Fort Dodge, Fort Madison, Indianola, Iowa City, Johnston, Keokuk, Marion, Marshalltown, Mason City, Muscatine, Newton, North Liberty, Oskaloosa, Ottumwa, Pella, Sioux City, Spencer, Storm Lake, Urbandale, Waterloo, Waukee, West Des Moines |
| Kansas | Andover, Arkansas City, Atchison, Coffeyville, Derby, Dodge City, El Dorado, Emporia, Garden City, Gardner, Great Bend, Hays, Haysville, Hutchinson, Junction City, Kansas City, Lansing, Lawrence, Leavenworth, Leawood, Lenexa, Liberal, Manhattan, McPherson, Merriam, Newton, Olathe, Ottawa, Overland Park, Parsons, Pittsburg, Prairie Village, Salina, Shawnee, Topeka, Wichita, Winfield |
| Kentucky | Ashland, Bardstown, Barlow, Berea, Bowling Green, Burlington, Corydon, Covington, Danville, Elizabethtown, Erlanger, Florence, Fort Campbell North, Fort Knox, Fort Thomas, Frankfort, Georgetown, Glasgow, Henderson, Hopkinsville, Independence, Jeffersontown, Kevil, La Center, Lawrenceburg, Ledbetter, Lexington, Louisville, Lyndon, Maceo, Madisonville, Marion, Mayfield, Middlesboro, Morganfield, Murray, Newport, Nicholasville, Owensboro, Paducah, Radcliff, Richmond, St. Matthews, Salem, Shelbyville, Shepherdsville, Shively, Smithland, Somerset, Sturgis, Waverly, Wickliffe, Winchester |
| Louisiana | Abbeville, Alexandria, Baker, Bastrop, Baton Rouge, Bayou Blue, Bayou Cane, Belle Chasse, Bogalusa, Bossier City, Central, Chalmette, Claiborne, Covington, Crowley, Denham Springs, DeRidder, Destrehan, Estelle, Eunice, Gardere, Gretna, Hammond, Harvey, Houma, Jefferson, Jennings, Kenner, Lafayette, Lake Charles, La Place, Luling, Mandeville, Marrero, Metairie, Minden, Monroe, Morgan City, Moss Bluff, Natchitoches, New Iberia, New Orleans, Opelousas, Pineville, Prairieville, Raceland, River Ridge, Ruston, Shenandoah, Shreveport, Slidell, Sulphur, Terrytown, Thibodaux, Timberlane, Waggaman, West Monroe, Woodmere, Zachary |
| Maine | Auburn, Augusta, Bangor, Biddeford, Brunswick, Lewiston, Portland, Saco, South Portland, Waterville, Westbrook |
| Maryland | Aberdeen, Accokeek, Adelphi, Annapolis, Annapolis Neck, Arbutus, Arnold, Aspen Hill, Ballenger Creek, Baltimore, Bel Air, Bel Air North, Bel Air South, Beltsville, Bensville, Bethesda, Bowie, Brooklyn Park, California, Calverton, Cambridge, Camp Springs, Carney, Catonsville, Chesapeake Ranch Estates, Chillum, Clarksburg, Clinton, Cloverly, Cockeysville, Colesville, College Park, Columbia, Crofton, Cumberland, Damascus, Dundalk, Easton, East Riverdale, Edgewood, Eldersburg, Elkridge, Elkton, Ellicott City, Essex, Fairland, Ferndale, Forestville, Fort Washington, Frederick, Gaithersburg, Germantown, Glassmanor, Glen Burnie, Glenmont, Glenn Dale, Greenbelt, Hagerstown, Halfway, Havre de Grace, Hillcrest Heights, Hyattsville, Ilchester, Joppatowne, Kemp Mill, Kettering, Lake Shore, Landover, Langley Park, Lanham, Largo, Laurel, Lexington Park, Linthicum, Lochearn, Maryland City, Mays Chapel, Middle River, Milford Mill, Mitchellville, Montgomery Village, New Carrollton, North Bethesda, North Potomac, Ocean City, Ocean Pines, Odenton, Olney, Overlea, Owings Mills, Oxon Hill, Parkville, Parole, Pasadena, Perry Hall, Pikesville, Potomac, Randallstown, Redland, Reisterstown, Riviera Beach, Rockville, Rosaryville, Rosedale, Rossville, Salisbury, Scaggsville, Seabrook, Severn, Severna Park, Silver Spring, South Laurel, Suitland, Summerfield, Takoma Park, Towson, Travilah, Waldorf, Walker Mill, Westminster, Wheaton, White Oak, Woodlawn |
| Massachusetts | Abington, Agawam, Amesbury, Amherst Center, Andover, Arlington, Attleboro, Barnstable, Belmont, Beverly, Boston, Braintree, Brockton, Brookline, Burlington, Cambridge, Chelsea, Chicopee, Danvers, Dedham, Easthampton, Everett, Fall River, Fitchburg, Framingham, Franklin, Gardner, Gloucester, Greenfield, Haverhill, Holbrook, Holyoke, Hudson, Hull, Lawrence, Leominster, Lexington, Longmeadow, Lowell, Lynn, Lynnfield, Malden, Marblehead, Marlborough, Martha's Vineyard, Maynard, Medford, Medway, Melrose, Methuen, Milford, Milton, Needham, New Bedford, Newburyport, Newton, North Adams, Northampton, Norwood, Palmer, Peabody, Pittsfield, Quincy, Randolph, Reading, Revere, Salem, Saugus, Somerset, Somerville, Southbridge, South Yarmouth, Springfield, Stoneham, Swampscott, Taunton, Wakefield, Waltham, Watertown, Webster, Wellesley, Westfield, West Springfield, Weymouth, Wilmington, Winchester, Winthrop, Woburn, Worcester |
| Michigan | Adrian, Allendale, Allen Park, Alpena, Ann Arbor, Auburn Hills, Battle Creek, Bay City, Beecher, Benton Harbor, Berkley, Beverly Hills, Big Rapids, Birmingham, Bloomfield Township, Burton, Cadillac, Canton Township, Clawson, Clinton Township, Coldwater, Comstock Park, Cutlerville, Dearborn, Dearborn Heights, Detroit, East Grand Rapids, East Lansing, Eastpointe, Escanaba, Farmington, Farmington Hills, Fenton, Ferndale, Flint, Forest Hills, Fraser, Garden City, Grand Haven, Grand Rapids, Grandville, Grosse Ile Township (part), Grosse Pointe Park, Grosse Pointe Woods, Hamtramck, Harper Woods, Harrison Township, Haslett, Hazel Park, Highland Park, Holland, Holt, Inkster, Ionia, Jackson, Jenison, Kalamazoo, Kentwood, Lansing, Lincoln Park, Livonia, Madison Heights, Marquette, Melvindale, Midland, Monroe, Mount Clemens, Mount Pleasant, Muskegon, Muskegon Heights, New Baltimore, Niles, Northview, Norton Shores, Novi, Oak Park, Okemos, Owosso, Plymouth Township, Pontiac, Portage, Port Huron, Redford Township, Riverview, Rochester, Rochester Hills, Romulus, Roseville, Royal Oak, Saginaw, St. Clair Shores, Sault Ste. Marie, Shelby Township, Southfield, Southgate, South Lyon, Sterling Heights, Sturgis, Taylor, Traverse City, Trenton, Troy, Walker, Warren, Waterford Township, Waverly, Wayne, West Bloomfield Township, Westland, Wixom, Woodhaven, Wyandotte, Wyoming, Ypsilanti |
| Midway Islands | Midway Atoll |
| Minnesota | Albert Lea, Alexandria, Andover, Anoka, Apple Valley, Austin, Bemidji, Big Lake, Blaine, Bloomington, Brainerd, Brooklyn Center, Brooklyn Park, Buffalo, Burnsville, Champlin, Chanhassen, Chaska, Cloquet, Columbia Heights, Coon Rapids, Cottage Grove, Crystal, Duluth, Eagan, East Bethel, Eden Prairie, Edina, Elk River, Fairmont, Faribault, Farmington, Fergus Falls, Forest Lake, Fridley, Golden Valley, Grand Rapids, Ham Lake, Hastings, Hibbing, Hopkins, Hugo, Hutchinson, Inver Grove Heights, Lakeville, Lino Lakes, Mankato, Maple Grove, Maplewood, Marshall, Mendota Heights, Minneapolis, Minnetonka, Monticello, Moorhead, Mounds View, New Brighton, New Hope, New Ulm, North Branch, Northfield, North Mankato, North St. Paul, Oakdale, Otsego, Owatonna, Plymouth, Prior Lake, Ramsey, Red Wing, Richfield, Robbinsdale, Rochester, Rosemount, Roseville, St. Cloud, St. Louis Park, St. Michael, St. Paul, St. Peter, Sartell, Sauk Rapids, Savage, Shakopee, Shoreview, South St. Paul, Stillwater, Vadnais Heights, Waconia, West St. Paul, White Bear Lake, Willmar, Winona, Woodbury, Worthington |
| Mississippi | Biloxi, Brandon, Brookhaven, Byram, Canton, Clarksdale, Cleveland, Clinton, Columbus', Corinth, Forest, Gautier, Greenville, Greenwood, Grenada, Gulfport, Hattiesburg, Hernando, Horn Lake, Indianola, Jackson, Laurel, Long Beach, Madison, McComb, Meridian, Moss Point, Natchez, Newton, Ocean Springs, Olive Branch, Oxford, Pascagoula, Pearl, Petal, Picayune, Ridgeland, Southaven, Starkville, Tupelo, Vicksburg, West Point, Winona, Yazoo City |
| Missouri | Affton, Arnold, Ballwin, Bellefontaine Neighbors, Belton, Blue Springs, Bolivar, Branson, Bridgeton, Cape Girardeau, Carthage, Chesterfield, Clayton, Columbia, Concord, Crestwood, Creve Coeur, Dardenne Prairie, Eureka, Excelsior Springs, Farmington, Ferguson, Festus, Florissant, Fort Leonard Wood, Fulton, Gladstone, Grain Valley, Grandview, Hannibal, Harrisonville, Hazelwood, Independence, Jackson, Jefferson City, Jennings, Joplin, Kansas City, Kennett, Kirksville, Kirkwood, Lake St. Louis, Lebanon, Lee's Summit, Lemay, Liberty, Manchester, Marshall, Maryland Heights, Maryville, Mehlville, Mexico, Moberly, Neosho, Nixa, Oakville, O'Fallon, Old Jamestown, Overland, Ozark, Poplar Bluff, Raymore, Raytown, Republic, Rolla, St. Ann, St. Charles, St. Joseph, St. Louis, St. Peters, Sedalia, Sikeston, Spanish Lake, Springfield, Town and Country, Troy, Union, University City, Warrensburg, Washington, Webb City, Webster Groves, Wentzville, West Plains, Wildwood |
| Montana | Billings, Bozeman, Butte, Great Falls, Helena, Kalispell, Missoula |
| Nebraska | Bellevue, Columbus, Fremont, Grand Island, Hastings, Kearney, Lincoln, Omaha, North Platte, Papillion, Scottsbluff, South Sioux City |
| Nevada | Alamo, Amargosa Valley, Austin, Baker, Battle Mountain, Beatty, Boulder City, Caliente, Carlin, Carson City, Cold Springs, Crystal Bay, Dayton, Elko, Ely, Empire, Enterprise, Eureka, Fallon, Fallon Station, Fernley, Gardnerville, Gardnerville Ranchos, Genoa, Gerlach, Glenbrook, Goodsprings, Golden Valley, Goldfield, Hawthorne, Henderson, Incline Village, Indian Hills, Jackpot, Jean, Johnson Lane, Kingsbury, Las Vegas, Laughlin, Lemmon Valley, Lovelock, Mesquite, Minden, Mogul, Mottsville, New Washoe City, Nixon, North Las Vegas, Pahrump, Paradise, Patrick, Pioche, Pleasant Valley, Poeville, Primm, Rachel, Reno, Round Hill Village, Searchlight, Sheridan, Silver Springs, Sloan, Spanish Springs, Sparks, Spring Creek, Spring Valley, Stateline, Steptoe, Summerlin, Summerlin South, Sun Valley, Sunrise Manor, Sutcliffe, Tonopah, Verdi, Virginia City, Vya, Wadsworth, Wells, West Wendover, Whitney, Winchester, Winnemucca, Yerington, Zephyr Cove |
| New Hampshire | Berlin, Claremont, Concord, Derry, Dover, Keene, Laconia, Lebanon, Manchester, Nashua, Portsmouth, Rochester |
| New Jersey | Asbury Park, Atlantic City, Berlin, Bridgeton, Camden, Cherry Hill, Clifton, Dover, East Brunswick, East Orange, Edison, Elizabeth, Fairview, Freehold, Glassboro, Hammonton, Jersey City, Lakewood, Lindenwold, Long Branch, Millville, Morristown, Neptune, Newark, New Brunswick, Ocean City, Old Bridge, Passaic, Paterson, Perth Amboy, Phillipsburg, Piscataway, Plainfield, Pleasantville, Point Pleasant, Princeton, Red Bank, Ridgewood, Roxbury, Somerville, Trenton, Union, Union City, Vineland, Warren, Willingboro |
| New Mexico | Alamogordo, Albuquerque, Artesia, Carlsbad, Carrizozo, Cloudcroft, Clovis, Deming, Eunice, Farmington, Gallup, Hobbs, Jal, Las Cruces, Las Vegas, Lordsburg, Los Alamos, Los Lunas, Lovington, Portales, Raton, Rio Rancho, Roswell, Ruidoso, Santa Fe, Silver City, Socorro, Sunland Park, Taos, Truth or Consequences, Tucumcari |
| New York | Albany, Amherst, Amsterdam, Auburn, Batavia, Bay Shore, Beacon, Binghamton, Brentwood, Buffalo, Canandaigua, Centereach, Central Islip, Cheektowaga, Cohoes, Cooperstown, Coram, Corning, Cortland, Dunkirk, Elmira, Endicott, Fredonia, Freeport, Fulton, Geneva, Glens Falls, Gloversville, Grand Island, Greece, Hamburg, Hempstead, Hicksville, Hornell, Huntington Station, Irondequoit, Ithaca, Jamestown, Jericho, Johnson City, Kingston, Lackawanna, Lake Placid, Levittown, Lewiston, Lockport, Long Beach, Malone, Massena, Middletown, Monroe, Newark, Newburgh, New City, New Rochelle, New York City, Niagara Falls, North Tonawanda, Ogdensburg, Olean, Oneida, Oneonta, Ossining, Oswego, Peekskill, Plattsburgh, Potsdam, Poughkeepsie, Rochester, Rome, Saratoga Springs, Schenectady, Syracuse, Tonawanda (city), Tonawanda (town), Troy, Utica, Watertown, West Babylon, White Plains, Yonkers |
| North Carolina | Albemarle, Asheboro, Asheville, Atlantic Beach, Boone, Burlington, Cape Carteret, Cary, Chapel Hill, Charlotte, Concord, Durham, Eden, Elizabeth City, Emerald Isle, Fayetteville, Gastonia, Goldsboro, Greensboro, Greenville, Havelock, Henderson, Hickory, High Point, Indian Beach, Jacksonville, Kannapolis, Kernersville, Kinston, Kitty Hawk, Laurinburg, Lenoir, Lexington, Lumberton, Morehead City, Morganton, New Bern, Raleigh, Reidsville, Roanoke Rapids, Rocky Mount, Roxboro, Salisbury, Sanford, Shelby, Statesville, Swansboro, Tarboro, Thomasville, Wilmington, Wilson, Winston-Salem |
| North Dakota | Bismarck, Dickinson, Fargo, Grand Forks, Jamestown, Mandan, Minot, Rugby, West Fargo, Williston |
| Northern Mariana Islands | Capitol Hill, Saipan, Garapan and more locations in the Northern Mariana Islands |
| Ohio | Akron, Alliance, Ashland, Ashtabula, Athens, Aurora, Barberton, Bellefontaine, Boardman, Bowling Green, Bucyrus, Cambridge, Canton, Chillicothe, Cincinnati, Circleville, Cleveland, Cleveland Heights, Columbus, Conneaut, Coshocton, Cuyahoga Falls, Dayton, Defiance, Delaware, Dover, East Liverpool, Elyria, Euclid, Fairborn, Fairfield, Findlay, Forest Park, Fostoria, Franklin, Fremont, Gahanna, Galion, Greenville, Hamilton, Huber Heights, Ironton, Kent, Kettering, Lakewood, Lancaster, Lebanon, Lima, Lorain, Mansfield, Marietta, Marion, Marysville, Mason, Massillon, Maumee, Medina, Mentor, Middletown, Mount Vernon, Newark, New Philadelphia, Niles, Norwalk, Norwood, Oregon, Oxford, Painesville, Parma, Phillipsburg, Piqua, Portsmouth, Ravenna, Salem, Sandusky, Shaker Heights, Sharonville, Sidney, Solon, Springfield, Steubenville, Strongsville, Sylvania, Tiffin, Toledo, Troy, Upper Arlington, Urbana, Vandalia, Van Wert, Warren, Washington Court House, Westerville, Willoughby, Wilmington, Wooster, Xenia, Youngstown, Zanesville |
| Oklahoma | Ada, Altus, Ardmore, Bartlesville, Bethany, Bixby, Broken Arrow, Chickasha, Claremore, Del City, Duncan, Durant, Edmond, Elk City, El Reno, Enid, Fort Gibson, Guthrie, Guymon, Lawton, McAlester, Miami, Midwest City, Moore, Muskogee, Mustang, Norman, Oklahoma City, Okmulgee, Owasso, Ponca City, Sand Springs, Sapulpa, Shawnee, Stillwater, Tahlequah, The Village, Tulsa, Weatherford, Woodward, Yukon |
| Oregon | Albany, Altamont, Ashland, Astoria, Baker City, Beaverton, Bend, Coos Bay, Corvallis, Eugene, Forest Grove, Grants Pass, Gresham, Hermiston, Hillsboro, Keizer, Klamath Falls, La Grande, Lake Oswego, Lebanon, McMinnville, Medford, Milwaukie, Newberg, Oak Grove, Oregon City, Pendleton, Portland, Roseburg, Salem, Santa Clara, Springfield, The Dalles, Tigard, Troutdale, Vale, Woodburn |
| Pennsylvania | Abington Township, Aliquippa, Allentown, Altoona, Beaver Falls, Berwick, Bethel Park, Bethlehem, Bloomsburg, Bradford, Butler, Canonsburg, Carbondale, Carlisle, Chambersburg, Chester, Coatesville, Columbia, Easton, Elizabethtown, Ephrata, Erie, Greensburg, Hanover, Harrisburg, Hazleton, Hershey, Indiana, Jeannette, Johnstown, Kingston, Lancaster, Lansdale, Latrobe, Lebanon, Levittown, Meadville, Monroeville, Mount Joy, New Castle, Norristown, Oil City, Penn Hills, Philadelphia, Phoenixville, Pittsburgh, Pottsville, Reading, Pennsylvania, Scranton, Sharon, State College, Sunbury, Uniontown, Warminster, Warren, Washington, West Chester, Wilkes-Barre, Williamsport, York |
| Puerto Rico | Major roads. Most streets in Caguaz, Ponce, Mayaguez, San Juan |
| Rhode Island | Bristol, Cranston, East Providence, Middletown, Newport, Pawtucket, Providence, Warwick, Westerly, West Warwick, Woonsocket |
| South Carolina | Aiken, Anderson, Beaufort, Bluffton, Charleston, Clemson, Columbia, Florence, Gaffney, Georgetown, Goose Creek, Greenville, Greenwood, Hilton Head Island, Laurens, Mount Pleasant, Myrtle Beach, Newberry, North Augusta, North Charleston, Orangeburg, Rock Hill, Spartanburg, Summerville, Sumter, Union |
| South Dakota | Aberdeen, Brookings, Pierre, Rapid City, Sioux Falls, Spearfish, Vermillion, Watertown, Yankton |
| Tennessee | Athens, Bartlett, Bristol, Brownsville, Chattanooga, Clarksville, Cleveland, Collierville, Columbia, Cookeville, Crossville, Dyersburg, Elizabethton, Erwin, Franklin, Gallatin, Germantown, Goodlettsville, Greeneville, Hendersonville, Humboldt, Jackson, Johnson City, Kingsport, Knoxville, Lawrenceburg, Lewisburg, Maryville, McMinnville, Memphis, Millington, Morristown, Murfreesboro, Nashville, Oak Ridge, Shelbyville, Somerville, Springfield, Tullahoma, Union City |
| Texas | Abilene, Alice, Allen, Alvin, Amarillo, Andrews, Angleton, Arlington, Athens, Austin, Bay City, Baytown, Beaumont, Bedford, Beeville, Bellaire, Belton, Benbrook, Big Spring, Borger, Brenham, Brownfield, Brownsville, Brownwood, Bryan, Burkburnett, Burleson, Canyon, Carrollton, Cedar Hill, Cleburne, Cloverleaf, College Station, Conroe, Copperas Cove, Corpus Christi, Corsicana, Dallas, Dawson, Deer Park, Del Rio, Denison, Denton, DeSoto, Donna, Dumas, Eagle Pass, Edinburg, El Campo, El Paso, Ennis, Fort Stockton, Fort Worth, Freeport, Friendswood, Frisco, Gainesville, Galveston, Garland, Gatesville, Georgetown, Grand Prairie, Grapevine, Greenville, Groves, Harker Heights, Harlingen, Henderson, Hereford, Houston, Humble, Huntsville, Hurst, Irving, Jacksonville, Jollyville, Kerrville, Kilgore, Killeen, Kingsville, Lake Jackson, La Marque, Lamesa, Lancaster, La Porte, Laredo, League City, Leon Valley, Levelland, Lewisville, Live Oak, Longview, Lubbock, Lufkin, Mansfield, Marshall, McAllen, McKinney, Mercedes, Mesquite, Midland, Mineral Wells, Mission, Missouri City, Mount Pleasant, Nacogdoches, Nederland, New Braunfels, North Richland Hills, Odessa, Orange, Palestine, Pampa, Paris, Pasadena, Pearland, Pharr, Plainview, Plano, Port Arthur, Portland, Port Lavaca, Port Neches, Richardson, Richmond, Rio Grande City, Robstown, Rockwall, Rosenberg, Round Rock, Rowlett, San Angelo, San Antonio, San Benito, San Marcos, Seabrook, Seagoville, Seguin, Sherman, Snyder, Spring, Stephenville, Sugar Land, Sulphur Springs, Taylor, Temple, Terrell, Texarkana, Texas City, The Woodlands, Tyler, Universal City, Uvalde, Vernon, Victoria, Vidor, Waco, Waxahachie, Weatherford, Weslaco, Wharton, Wichita Falls |
| U.S. Virgin Islands | Frederiksted, Buccaneer Golf Course, etc. on Saint Croix |
| Utah | American Fork, Bountiful, Brigham City, Cedar City, Centerville, Clearfield, Kaysville, Kearns, Layton, Logan, Murray, North Ogden, Ogden, Orem, Payson, Pleasant Grove, Provo, Riverton, Roy, St. George, Salt Lake City, Sandy, South Ogden, Spanish Fork, Springville, Taylorsville, Tooele, West Jordan, West Valley City |
| Vermont | Barre, Bennington, Brattleboro, Burlington, Lyndonville, Middlebury, Montpelier, Newport, Rutland, St. Albans, St. Johnsbury, South Burlington, South Hero, Springfield, Vergennes, Waterbury, Winooski |
| Virginia | Alexandria, Annandale, Arlington, Blacksburg, Bristol, Charlottesville, Chesapeake, Chester, Christiansburg, Colonial Heights, Dale City, Danville, Fredericksburg, Front Royal, Hampton, Harrisonburg, Hopewell, Leesburg, Lynchburg, Madison Heights, Manassas, Martinsville, Mechanicsville, Newport News, Norfolk, Petersburg, Poquoson, Portsmouth, Pulaski, Radford, Reston, Richmond, Roanoke, Salem, Staunton, Suffolk, Virginia Beach, Waynesboro, Williamsburg, Winchester, Woodbridge |
| Washington | Aberdeen, Anacortes, Auburn, Bellevue, Bellingham, Bremerton, Burien, Centralia, Dishman, Eatonville, Edmonds, Ellensburg, Elma, Everett, Federal Way, Hoquiam, Issaquah, Kelso, Kennewick, Kent, Kirkland, Lacey, Lakewood, Longview, Lynnwood, Mercer Island, Montesano, Moses Lake, Mount St. Helens, Mount Vernon, Mukilteo, Oak Harbor, Olympia, Opportunity, Orchards, Parkland, Pasco, Port Angeles, Preston, Pullman, Puyallup, Raymond, Redmond, Renton, Richland, Rochester, SeaTac, Seattle, Sequim, Shoreline, Spokane, Sumas, Tacoma, Tumwater, University Place, Vancouver, Walla Walla, Wenatchee, Yakima, and more |
| West Virginia | Beckley, Bluefield, Charleston, Clarksburg, Fairmont, Huntington, Martinsburg, Morgantown, Moundsville, Parkersburg, St. Albans, South Charleston, Vienna, Weirton, Wheeling |
| Wisconsin | Ashwaubenon, Appleton, Ashland, Beaver Dam, Beloit, Chippewa Falls, Cudahy, De Pere, Eau Claire, Fond du Lac, Fort Atkinson, Green Bay, Janesville, Kaukauna, Kenosha, La Crosse, Madison, Manitowoc, Marinette, Marshfield, Menasha, Menomonee Falls, Menomonie, Merrill, Middleton, Milwaukee, Monroe, Neenah, New Berlin, Oconomowoc, Oregon, Oshkosh, Platteville, Port Washington, Racine, River Falls, Sheboygan, South Milwaukee, Stevens Point, Stoughton, Sun Prairie, Superior, Two Rivers, Watertown, Waukesha, Wausau, Wauwatosa, West Allis, West Bend, Whitefish Bay, Whitewater, Wisconsin Rapids |
| Wyoming | Casper, Cheyenne, Evanston, Gillette, Grand Teton National Park, Green River, Jackson, Laramie, Riverton, Rock Springs, Sheridan, Yellowstone National Park |
