= List of street view services =

This is a list of online mapping services that provide street-level imagery, grouped by world region.

== Worldwide ==
- Google Street View is the most comprehensive street view service in the world. It provides street view for more than 85 countries worldwide.
- Apple Look Around provides street view for 36 countries.
- Microsoft Bing Streetside offered street view via right click in Bing Maps. (Discontinued in October 2025.)
- The Mapillary project collects crowdsourced images from its users, which are licensed under a CC BY-SA license.
- KartaView (formerly OpenStreetCam) was created by TeleNav and is very similar to Mapillary both by using crowdsourced imagery and for licensing the images as CC BY-SA.
- Panoramax, an open-source street view software that can federate between different instances. Includes instances by OpenStreetMap chapters (e.g. in France and Croatia), the French Institut national de l'information géographique et forestière, and others.

== Africa ==
- Morocco: Carte.ma provides panoramic streetsides for quite a few cities in Morocco.
- Nigeria: Moriwo offers panoramic street views of Lagos.

== Asia ==
- Armenia: Russian company Yandex offers street panoramas for Yerevan.
- Bangladesh: Bangladeshi Company Barikoi, offers street360 for Dhaka.
- China:
  - Tencent Maps offers street view for many cities around China including Shenzhen, Shanghai, Beijing, Guangzhou, Nanjing, Suzhou, Fuzhou, Xiamen, Xi'an, Chengdu, Kunming, Wuhan, Lijiang, Dali, Sanya, Wuyuan, Ürümqi, Harbin, Changchun, Gobi Desert, Lhasa and other sparsely populated places.
  - Baidu Maps covers most of China's prefecture-level cities and some counties.
  - AutoNavi street view service stopped in the years 2014/15.
- India: MapmyIndia offers street level view (marketed as "real view") for some Indian cities such as New Delhi, Mumbai, Pune, Chennai, Puducherry, Hyderabad, Bangalore, Mysore, Ahmedabad, Gandhinagar, Jodhpur, Jaipur, Ajmer, Silvassa, Chandigarh, Panchkula and more others. WoNoBo, now defunct. Vidteq now defunct.
- Iran: Tehran,Municipality of Isfahan, myIsfahan
- Japan: Location View, now defunct. Apple’s Look Around (featured in Apple Maps) provides street view for Tokyo, Osaka, Kyoto and Nagoya.
- Kazakhstan: Russian company Yandex offers street panoramas for Astana, Almaty and Karaganda, as does Google Street View.
- Kuwait: Kuwait Finder app, by the government of Kuwait, provides street view for most of the country.
- Malaysia: Urban Explorer, a Malaysian company provides paid services for 3D street view services throughout Malaysia. Also provides 3D indoor mapping services.
- South Korea: Kakao Maps and Naver Maps both offer frequently updated street view coverage in most of the country.
- Thailand:
  - MapJack provides street views of the south of the country.
  - MappointAsia Thailand provides professional level custom street views with photogram or Lidar.
- North Korea: Singaporean photographer Aram Pan created a website called DPRK 360 that provide panoramas of many points of interest. A Russian trolleybus and tram website collected a number of videos of the country on a map.
- Uzbekistan: Russian company Yandex offers street panoramas for Tashkent, Samarkand, Shahrisabz, Bukhara, Khiva and more other locations.
- Vietnam: Streetview.vn is part of the Openmap.vn project developed by 44+ Technologies. It is a Vietnamese digital mapping platform that offers 360° panoramic street-level views of locations across Vietnam. It serves as a local alternative to Vietnam, especially in areas where other street service coverage is limited or unavailable.

== Europe ==
- Albania: ASIG offers street view for all national roads and some urban roads for Albania.
- Belarus: Russian company Yandex offers street panoramas for Minsk, Brest, Gomel, Grodno, Mogilev and Vitebsk.
- Belgium: CycloMedia offers a charged service providing street views of Flanders on pixel level with 10 cm accuracy. Geckomatics develops AI based mobile mapping systems.
- Bosnia and Herzegovina: Rutmap offers street view for center of Bosnia and Herzegovina capital Sarajevo.
- Bulgaria: Bulgarian based companies BusinessView and VisionTech are Google StreetView Trusted photographers and provide high quality virtual tours for Google Maps
- Czech Republic: Panorama is available at mapy.com. It provides free street view service for a whole country.
- Denmark: CycloMedia offers a charged service providing street views of Odense, Aarhus and Copenhagen on pixel level with 10 cm accuracy. The Danish map-tool Krak offers their own version of street view in the largest Danish cities, including Copenhagen, Odense and Aarhus. Nokia Maps or HERE offers street views of Copenhagen. COWI offers the charged service Danmarks Digitale Gadefoto (DDG), which sees yearly updates of full coverage panoramas including the Faeroese Islands.
- France: Mappy provides street views of major cities in France. Centers and suburbs main roads are covered. Microsoft Bing Maps Streetside also provides street view of several cities.
- Germany: CycloMedia offers a charged service providing street views of over 50 cities in Germany on pixel level with 10 cm accuracy. Bing Maps offered street view for Berlin, Frankfurt, Munich, Augsburg, Ingolstadt, Nuremberg, Fürth, Erlangen, Stuttgart, Pforzheim, Karlsruhe, Wiesbaden, Mainz, Düsseldorf, Essen and other locations until May 23, 2012.
- Hungary: Romanian company NORC provided street view service for Budapest, Debrecen, Győr, Miskolc, Szeged, Hajdúszoboszló, Siófok and the rest of Lake Balaton's shores. The site seems to have been down since early November 2013.
- Iceland: Icelandic search engine ja.is offers street view.
- (Republic of Ireland) Ireland: "Position Images" was the world's first "Street View"-style service and was launched in 2001.
- Italy: Italiaonline company runs an online map service Tuttocittà which provides street views of locations across Italy.
- Kosovo: GjirafaPikBiz offers street view for all major locations of Kosovo.
- Netherlands: CycloMedia offers a charged service providing actual and historic street views of the Netherlands on pixel level with 10 cm accuracy.
- Norway: CycloMedia offers a charged service providing street views of Oslo, Bergen and Trondheim on pixel level with 10 cm accuracy. Norwegian web page Finn.no launched their own Street View service. There are 12 cities and towns available so far. The quality of the imagery seems better than the service offered by Google, and the images are more recently taken. Nokia Maps or HERE offers street views of Oslo.
- Romania: NORC (now defunct), provided street views of various cities and locations in Austria, Czech Republic, Hungary, Poland, Romania, Russia, and Slovakia.
- Russia: Russia's largest search engine, Yandex, launched street panoramas on September 9, 2009. The services is available on maps.yandex.ru and maps.yandex.com. Yandex's Street Panoramas is available for Moscow, and more than 150 other cities in Russia. Yandex also has the street view of the entire Moscow-Saint Petersburg motorway. Yandex also offers hot air balloon views for Saint Petersburg. Regional portals on ru09.ru have street views for Tomsk, Novosibirsk and Sochi.
- Spain: HERE and Yahoo! Maps offers street views of Madrid and Barcelona. Bing Maps offers street views for some cities.
- Sweden: EGmedia.se and CycloMedia Technology BV offers actual street views of the largest cities in Sweden e.g. Gothenburg, Stockholm, Gävle and Malmö on pixel level with 10 cm accuracy. Eniro Kartor provides street-level view of the majority of cities.
- Switzerland: HeliEngadin is a Google Certified for 360° StreetView acquisition, using high resolution ground equipment and drone mounted cameras; indoor imaging and navigation also possible. GlobalVision launched VideoStreetView web-platform in December 2009. The project covers large parts of the country and displays 360° immersive images in full-video motion alongside dynamic maps.
- Turkey: The Russian company Yandex offers street panoramas for Ankara, Istanbul, Bursa, İzmit, Kuşadası, Didim and İzmir. In 2014 Antalya, Alanya, Manavgat, Fethiye, Marmaris, Afyonkarahisar and more other locations were added. Also a local service Dunya 360 offers street view for Göynük and some other places. Istanbul Metropolitan Municipality offers street view for Istanbul.
- Ukraine: Russian company Yandex offers street panoramas for Kyiv, Lviv, Odesa, Dnipro, Kharkiv, Donetsk, Pripyat (abandoned city near Chernobyl Nuclear Power Plant) and other locations.
- United Kingdom:
  - Mapilio offers street panorama, Nokia Maps offers street views of London. Bing Maps offers street view for London, Liverpool and Manchester. HERE/Yahoo! Maps provides street view of several UK cities. Eye2eye Software has systematically photographed Britain in 360 degree panoramas and stills, publishing the collection as the school resource and home reference Eye2eye Britain.
  - BBC Domesday Reloaded offered online access to a subset of the street and interior 360 views, created for the 1986 LaserDisc based BBC Domesday Project, the website is now defunct, with a copy held at The National Archives (United Kingdom).

== North America ==
- Canada: Microsoft's Bing Maps introduced Streetside in December 2009. It featured selected areas in Vancouver and Whistler, British Columbia associated with the 2010 Winter Olympic Games.
- United States: Bing Maps Streetside, which provides street views of many cities across the U.S., was Microsoft's main competing service to Google Street View in the United States until it was discontinued in October 2025. CycloMedia has captured street-level imagery of many large metropolitan areas in the US starting in 2013; it is licensed to business and government organizations and not available to the general public, though at least one government (the City of Philadelphia) has made its CycloMedia imagery publicly accessible. EveryScape and MapJack provide street views of some cities. MapQuest had a street view service called 360 View, which was discontinued in August 2011. earthmine uses vehicle-mounted camera rigs to capture imagery and three dimensional data of the urban environment.

== South America ==
- Argentina: Two Argentine street view services have existed. Mapplo was claimed to be the first in Latin America. Mapplo closed in 2012. Fotocalle, another Argentine project, is claimed to be the first street view service in the world to provide HD pictures. Fotocalle is not working as of November 2020.
- Chile: Chilean company Publiguías released a service similar to Google's Street View in December 2010 called Street Diving. It currently offers views of Providencia and Santiago communes, with plans to expand it to other communes in the future. XYGO launched a street view service in April 2011 marginally covering seven cities. It now covers over 50 cities and claims to have coverage for 240 communes of Chile, which they will be releasing periodically.
