= ImmersiVision =

Canadian Electronics Company

- Available in: English
- Website: https://www.immersivision.com/

ImmersiVision Interactive Technologies Inc. is a Whistler, British Columbia, Canada based company, founded in early 2004, whose primarily revenue source was the production of immersive virtual reality. The product is similar to Google Streetview. The Immersive media is a mixture of both indoor and outdoor content. In early 2008 it licensed its technology to VTour Interactive and shortly after ceased active production. VTour is currently active in the production of immersive virtual reality under that licensee agreement and has since expanded upon the technology originally developed by ImmersiVision.

ImmersiVision's virtual destinations:

City	Region	Country
Whistler	British Columbia	Canada
Vancouver	British Columbia	Canada

VTour destinations - under ImmersiVision production license:

City	Region	Country
Alpine Meadows	California	United States
Alta Ski Resort	Utah	United States
Brighton Ski Resort	Utah	United States
The Canyons	Utah	United States
Deer Valley	Utah	United States
Heavenly Mountain Resort	California	United States
Incline Village	Nevada	United States
Mammoth Mountain Ski Area	California	United States
Northstar at Tahoe	California	United States
Park City Mountain Resort	Utah	United States
Reno	Nevada	United States
Salt Lake City	Utah	United States
Snowbird Ski Resort	Utah	United States
Squaw Valley Ski Resort	California	United States
Sugar Bowl Ski Resort	California	United States
Wendover	Nevada	United States

== Development ==
The ImmersiVision technology was launched in June 2004 with an online demonstration of an immersive walking tour of Whistler Village. This initial public launch was the first of several StreetView type technologies. A couple years later other similar technologies started appearing such as MotionVR and SuperTour (which later became Everyscape). Google Streetview made its debut in 2007 bringing the concept into the realm of popular culture.

The ImmersiVision player was a series of nested interactive QuickTime files placed within a single QuickTime skin. Active development of the technology carried on from early 2003 until December 11, 2007 when Apple launched QuickTime 7.3.1 which removed Flash and the advanced interactive features from within QuickTime. Shortly after that the underlying media player was converted over to a component structure consisting of both Adobe Flash and JavaScript.

By the end of 2008 technological development of the immersive virtual reality player was handed over to First Tracks Publishing and the player was renamed VTour. The technology continues to evolve under a licensee agreement and the patronage of 'VTour Interactive'.

== Award ==
- Top 10 New Business Ventures of 2007 in British Columbia. Awarded by New Ventures BC, a not for profit group.
- Most Innovative VR Player of 2007. Awarded by IVRPA (International Virtual Reality Photographers Association)

== See also ==
- Everyscape
- earthmine
- Google Streetview
