= CycloMedia =

Dutch company

Cyclomedia Technology BV
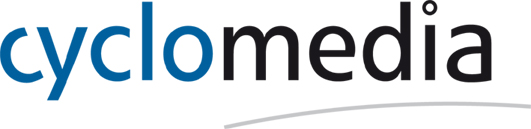
- Type: Private limited company
- Industry: Geographic information systems
- Founded: 1980
- Headquarters: Zaltbommel, Netherlands
- Key people: Sean Fernback (CEO)
- Products: Mobile Mapping (Cycloramas)
- Website: www.cyclomedia.com

Cyclomedia is a Dutch company specialising in the large-scale and systematic visualisation of environments based on 360° panoramic photographs (also known as cycloramas). Using specialised technology, large public areas are photographed and stored in an online database. Overlapping panoramic images are captured at 5-meter intervals from public roads, producing street-level imagery with the camera system mounted on a moving car.

This service is not available to the general public.

== Applications ==
The high resolution spherical panoramas are located to an accuracy within 10 cm, allowing the user to perform photogrammetric 3D measurements and use the imagery for 3D modelling and texture mapping. The panoramic photographs have been used for the construction of virtual environments, indoors as well as outdoors in the form of 3D city models. The imagery has also been used for the quality control of large-scale maps.

== History ==
=== 1980–1990 ===
The idea of 360° panoramic photography originated at the Delft University of Technology. The first research for a camera prototype, the FRANK system, was carried out in 1980. In 1986 the Frank Data company was established in 's-Hertogenbosch. In 1987 the first prototype of the camera was ready to make black and white recordings. The name CycloMedia was first used as a brand name by Frank Data.

=== 1991–2000 ===
At the end of 1991 the development of a digital film scanner and computer-controlled measuring system started; it came into commercial use a few years later. In 1992 the company moved to Vught. Cyclomedia was launched on 4 October 1994. In 1995 the municipality of Rotterdam became its first customer, commissioning the imaging of the whole city. In 1999 Cyclomedia moved to Waardenburg.

=== 2001–2004 ===
Digital full colour photography was introduced. A new, digital system, the Digital Cyclorama Recorder (DCR) 2, came into use in 2001.

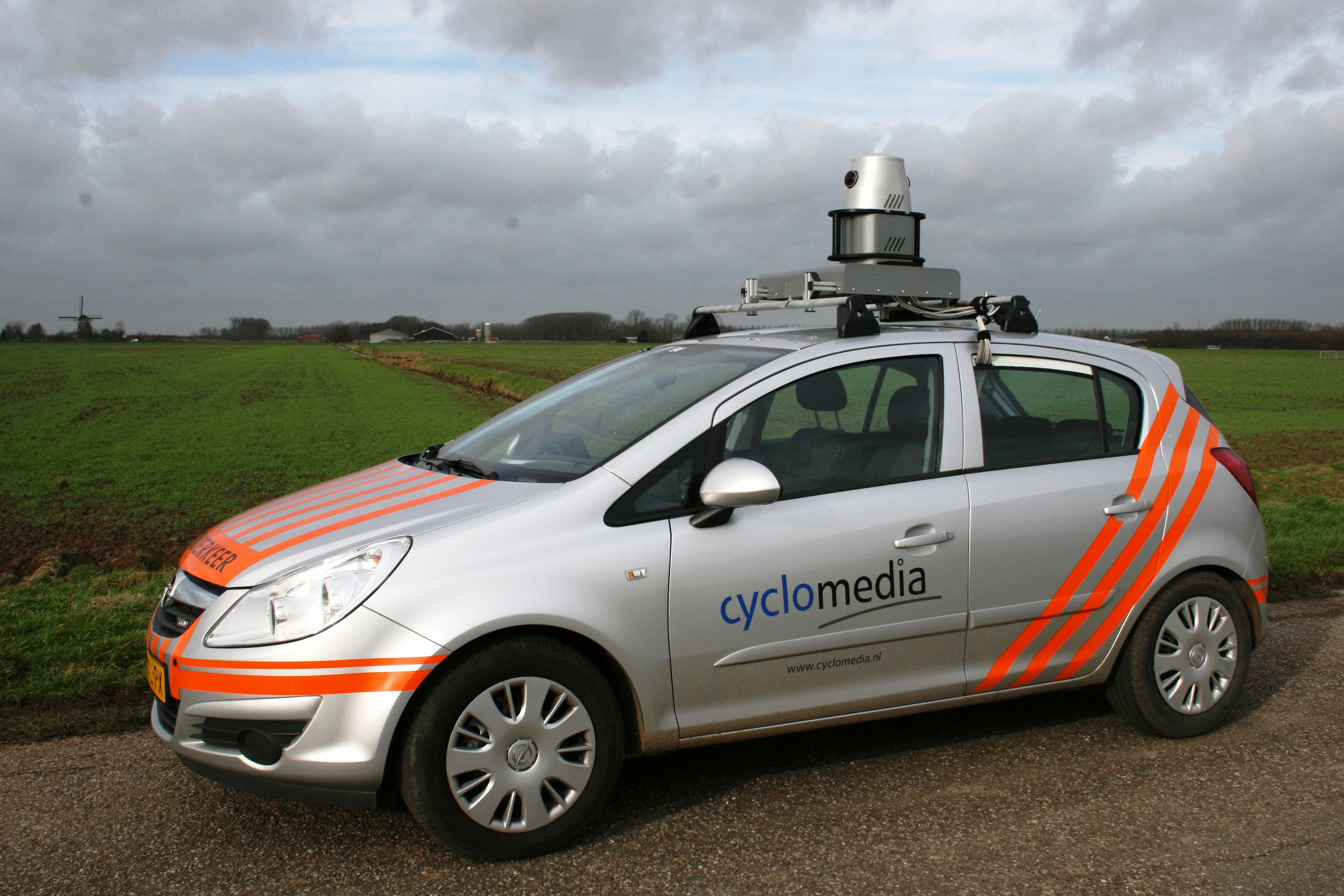
Cyclomedia DCR 7

=== 2005–2009 ===
In July 2005 CycloMedia introduced another new production system, DCR 3, and a portable system making it possible to make recordings at locations that a car cannot reach. In 2006 the company again started to build a photo database of the Netherlands. Further developments were put in hand in the fields of camera technology (DCR 7, to make recordings while driving) and 3D imaging. In 2009 Cyclomedia began automated traffic sign detection using Cyclorama.

=== 2010 onwards ===
The GlobeSpotter® web based viewer (SaaS) was launched in 2010. The following year the company brought out its 9th generation digital recording system (DCR9), including additional picture-in-picture cameras for capturing high resolution Cycloramas. Cyclomedia also upgraded its 3D processing technology based on point cloud and textured mesh processing methods. Cyclorama came into use in the Nordic countries, Germany and other parts of Europe, and the US. In 2013, the company added nationwide oblique imagery (NederlandObliek) with full functional integration in GlobeSpotter®. In May 2013 the company moved to Zaltbommel.

== See also ==
- Google Maps
- Google Earth
- Immersive Media Company
- Here Technologies
- Eye2eye Software
- Location View
- EveryScape
- Bing Maps
