= Panoramax =

Collection of street imagery

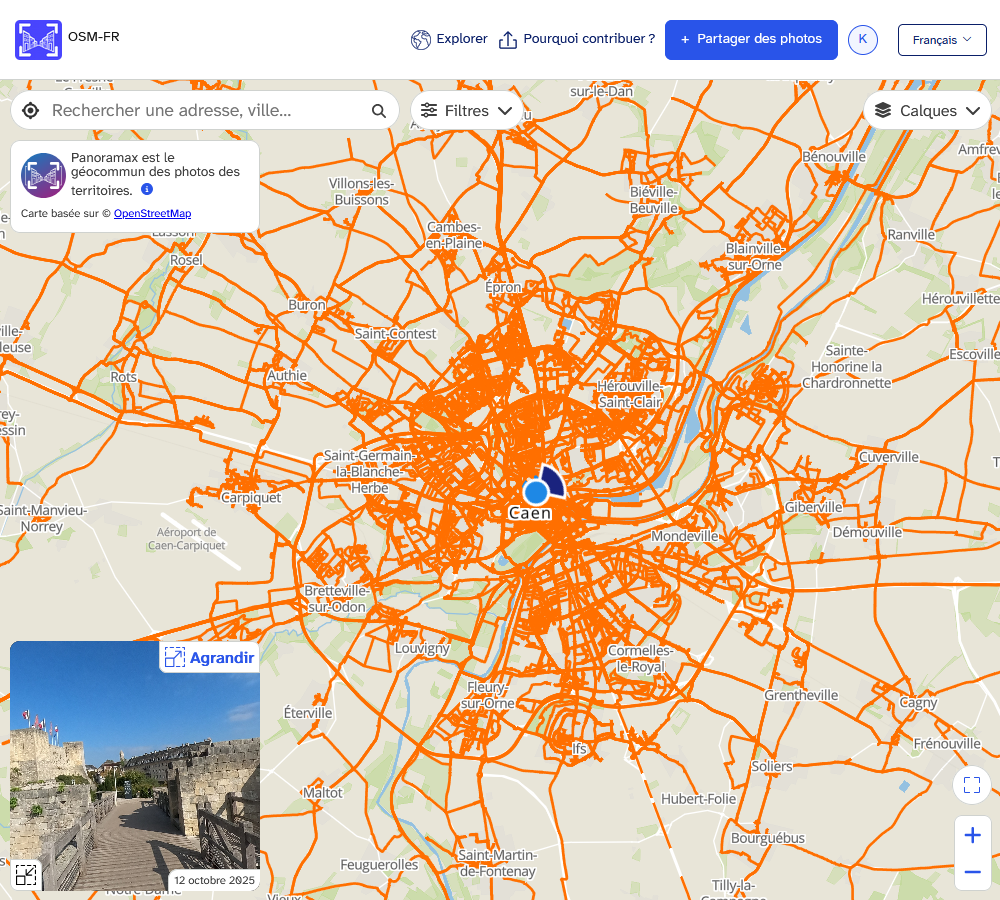
- Website type: Crowdsourcing of street-level imagery
- Country of origin: France
- Website: panoramax.fr
- Commercial: No
- Users: 2683 contributors

Panoramax is a project to collect and display street-level imagery, implemented as free and open source software. It allows the crowdsourcing of images, which are then openly licensed. The project was started in 2022 by the French National Geographic Institute (Institut national de l'information géographique et forestière, IGN) and the French OpenStreetMap (OSM) chapter, and was initially designed and developed by a state-owned start-up. Panoramax is updated and maintained by a community of volunteers and IGN staff.

As a free and open source alternative to Google Street View, all components of the Panoramax infrastructure are openly licensed. Panoramax is a federated system that allows individuals and organizations to host their own instances for image hosting. As of 2025, six Panoramax instances were online, beyond the initial two run by IGN & OSM France, including instances for Taiwan and Wales.

== History ==
In 2021, OpenStreetMap France responded to an IGN consultation on "geocommons" proposing the creation of an open database for street-level images. In April 2022, as part of its "Geocommons Factory", the IGN picked OSM's proposal as one of three projects to be developed, and launched a call for partners.

Panoramax was launched in October 2022. The name "Panoramax" was decided upon after a proposal phase and vote by 48 community members. It was initially envisioned as a tool to respond to problems encountered by local authorities and other French stakeholders, such as updating inventories of street furniture and road infrastructure.

The project's budget was €500,000, and 6 people worked on the project as of March 2024.

By April 2024, 284 contributors had provided 17.7 million photos, including citizen volunteers, companies (Suez & Véolia) and local communities such as Greater Lyon, Strasbourg. In June 2024, Panoramax won a grant by the NLnet Foundation as part of the NGI0 Commons Fund, which is supported by the European Commission as part of the Next Generation Internet program. In the same year, the project also gained more media attention, especially in public and private French-speaking media, including Franceinfo, France Bleu, Europe 1 and ZDNet.

In April 2026, the federation of Panoramax instances reached a total of over 100 million uploaded images. At the end of the same month, the French OpenStreetMap chapter announced that their instance, which until then accepted imagery from anywhere in the world for testing purposes, would have to limit itself to only accepting imagery from French territories due to storage constraints, and started a crowdfunding campaign for the third birthday of the instance's existence. At the same time, further Panoramax instances started, bringing the total number of public instances to 12, including by the Croatian OSM group and an instance in Argentina.

== Images ==
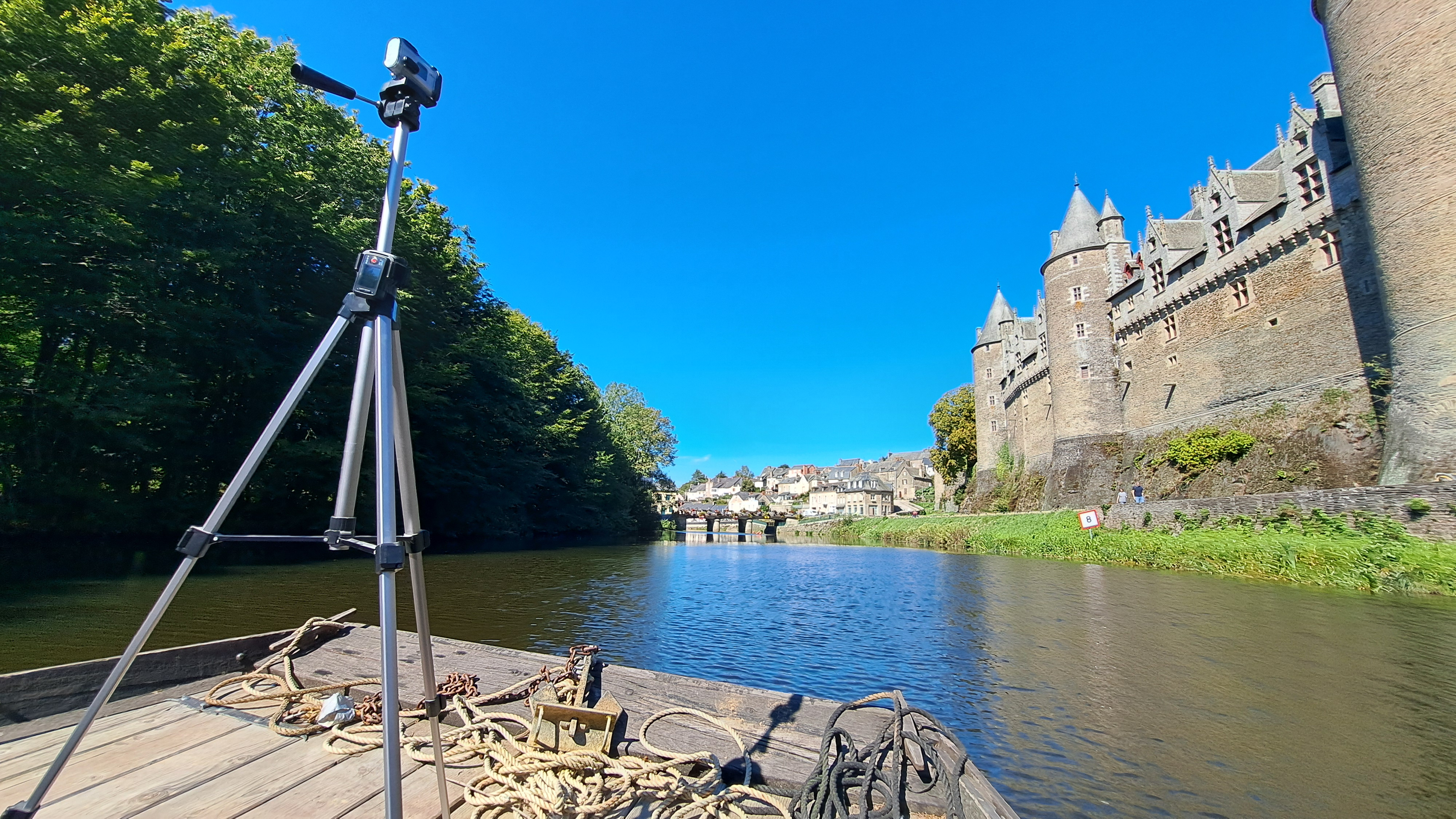
Taking pictures from a boat.

Panoramax accepts both 360-degree and flat photos, which are usually submitted as part of a sequence showing progression along an outdoor route. As of May 24, 2026, over 105 million images have been added by more than 2100 contributors across 12 instances.

=== Open licensing ===
Images hosted and published using the software are openly licensed and allow the free re-use of the images, unlike proprietary projects such as Google Street View, which are controlled by Google and thus largely prevent the re-use of images.

Images can be published under various open licenses. The OSM France instance uses Creative Commons BY-SA 4.0, with an added authorization to generate non-photographic data under an open database license (ODbL). The French IGN instance publishes images using the etalab-2.0 license ("Licence Ouverte").

=== Contributing to Panoramax ===
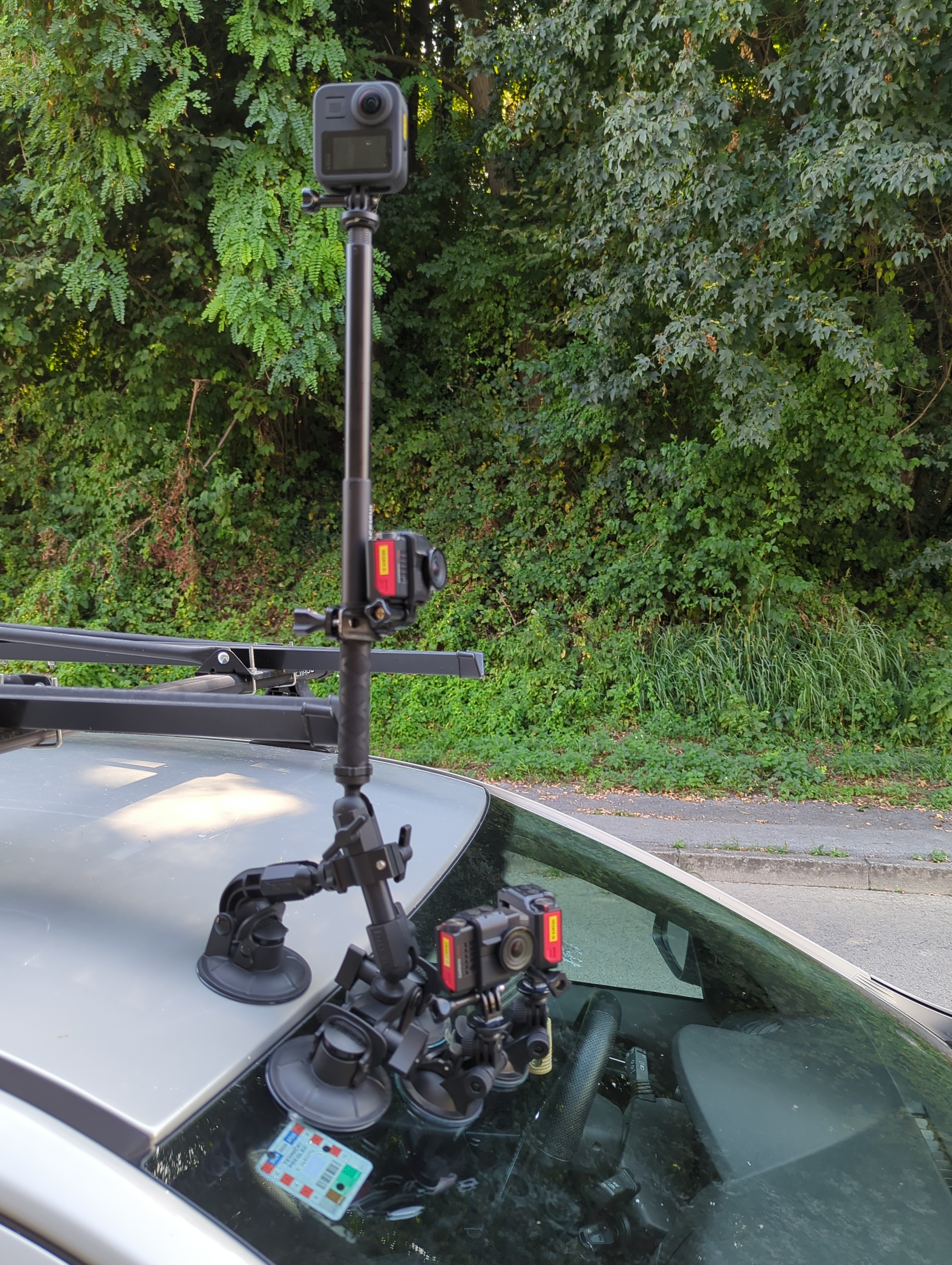
Equipment on a car.

There are multiple ways to contribute and access images, including via an instance's website, command-line interface or API, as well as a mobile application. During the import, each uploaded photo is subjected to image recognition to identify parts of the image that should be anonymized (i.e. blurring faces and license plates), to comply with the privacy regulations such as the French CNIL.

== Software and infrastructure ==
Panoramax is a federated system that allows individuals and organizations to set up their own instances for image hosting. Instances are listed in the Panoramax meta-catalog to allow access to their images across the whole federation. All components of the Panoramax infrastructure are openly licensed.

=== API ===
An API allows downloading and searching for images, for example to distribute them to tools such as viewers. It is based on the STAC standard, to ensure interoperability with existing tools.

The API also allows third parties to serve as applications for uploading and/or displaying images. For example, the iD and JOSM editors for OpenStreetMap can display images from Panoramax to support mapping, as can OSM-based navigation apps.

There is also a growing list of applications that can be used to upload images to Panoramax instances, including MapComplete, Vespucci and Baba.

== Use cases ==
Use cases include being able to monitor conditions of the roads and street furniture, signs, trees, overhead cables, or to verify compliance with regulations on advertising displays. The departmental fire and rescue service ("service départemental d’incendie et de secours) uses Panoramax to map fire hydrants and tracks that can be used in cases of wildfires.

The images provided by Panoramax are also widely used in the OpenStreetMap (OSM) ecosystem, both for mapping and products based on OSM data. For example, the iD OSM editor supports overlaying Panoramax images to help during mapping, as well as cross-linking Panoramax images to OSM objects. Similarly, OSM-based map applications and websites such as Cartes.app support either linking out to web-based Panoramax viewers or can directly display the images in-app.

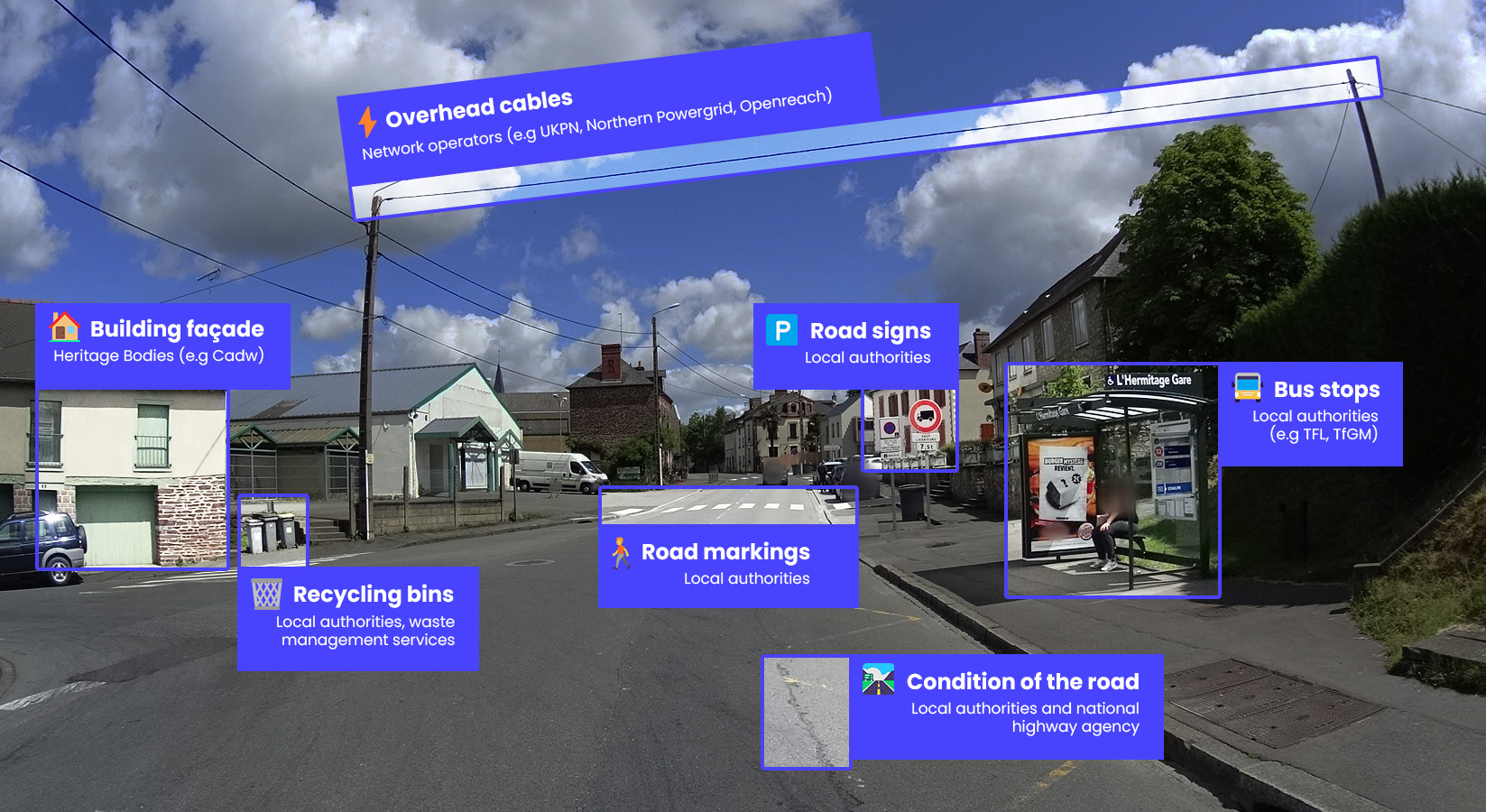
A photograph provides useful information for a variety of purposes.
