= KartaView =

Website crowdsourcing street-level photos

- Owner: Grab Holdings
- Website: kartaview.org
- Launched: 2009
- Current status: Active
- Content license: CC BY-SA

KartaView, formerly called OpenStreetView and OpenStreetCam, is a project to collect crowdsourced street-level photographs for improving OpenStreetMap operated by Grab Holdings. Collected imagery is published under a CC BY-SA license and while some of the project's code is released as open source, much of it (most notably, the mobile app) still require proprietary software to function. This is one of the few alternative platforms that offer street view like Google.

Contributors gather imagery with their smartphones using an Android or iOS app. It is also possible to upload images captured with other cameras. The KartaView app supports using an OBD-II dongle plugged into the vehicle; in concert with the mobile device's GPS, KartaView can derive more accurate image locations. The app also recognizes and processes street signs in real time while capturing imagery. Once the imagery is recorded, it is uploaded, processed, and published to the website.

OpenStreetMap editors can access KartaView images using the iD editor or JOSM plugin.

KartaView's purpose resembles that of Mapillary. The main difference between the two is that KartaView's web and mobile apps are at least partially open-source (although no functioning open-source app can be built at least since December 2017, due to requirement of other proprietary components), whereas Mapillary mobile app does not open source even that. KartaView also makes it easier for user to delete their uploaded photos in case they change their mind about contributing.

== History ==
KartaView was founded in 2009 as OpenStreetView. In 2016, TeleNav took over the openstreetview.org domain and started its own service under the name. The service was renamed to OpenStreetCam after an intervention by an unnamed trademark holder.

On December 12, 2019, TeleNav sold OpenStreetCam to Grab Holdings for an undisclosed amount.

In November 2020, OpenStreetCam became KartaView.
