= Galene (software) =

Videoconferencing software

- Developer: Juliusz Chroboczek
- Initial release: December 19, 2020; 5 years ago
- Stable release: 1.0 / 9 August 2025
- Repository: github.com/jech/galene
- Written in: Go, JavaScript
- Type: Videoconferencing
- License: MIT License
- Website: galene.org

Galene or Galène is a free and open-source multiplatform videoconferencing system that aims to use moderate server resources and to be very simple to install, administer and maintain.

== History ==
Galene was initially developed in the spring of 2020, during the first COVID-19 lockdown to provide a platform for remote teaching and remote examinations for the Department of Computer Science of the University of Paris-Cité. In September 2020, it started being used for staff meetings in addition to teaching, and was later used for remote access at a number of scientific and technical conferences.

Between September 2020 and February 2021, development of Galene was partly supported by Nexedi. Since June 2024, Galene development is being funded by the NLnet foundation.

== Technical details ==
Galene is based on the WebRTC protocol suite. Galene's server is implemented in Go, and uses the Pion implementation of WebRTC. It implements two signalling protocols: Galene's native protocol, which is fully documented and designed to be easy to implement by third-party clients, and the IETF WHIP protocol, which provides support for audio and video ingress from clients such as OBS Studio.

Galene comes bundled with a default client that is written in JavaScript and is able to run in recent versions of all major browsers. Other clients have been developed, but, as of January 2025, none are as complete as the default client.

== See also ==
- Comparison of VoIP software
- Comparison of web conferencing software
- List of free and open-source software packages
- Jitsi
- BigBlueButton
