= Earthmine =

Coordinates: 37°51′43″N 122°17′53.08″W

earthmine, inc.
- Type: Private
- Industry: digital mapping surveying
- Founded: 2006
- Headquarters: 2390A Fourth Street, Berkeley, California, United States
- Website: earthmine.com

earthmine, inc. is a company located in Berkeley, California devoted to "indexing reality". The company uses vehicle mounted camera rigs to capture imagery and three dimensional data of the urban environment. It was founded in 2006 by John Ristevski and Anthony Fassero.

== Technology ==
earthmine uses technology licensed from the Jet Propulsion Laboratory to capture 3D data at regular intervals while driving. Collection is accomplished with the MARS collection system, which employs a set of cameras mounted to the roof of a car. As of November 2009, earthmine has established a network of collection partners in the United States and around the world.

The collected data is processed to create a library of 3D panoramic imagery, from which measurements can be made. A set of tools exists so that users can access this data through a flash application or a smart phone.

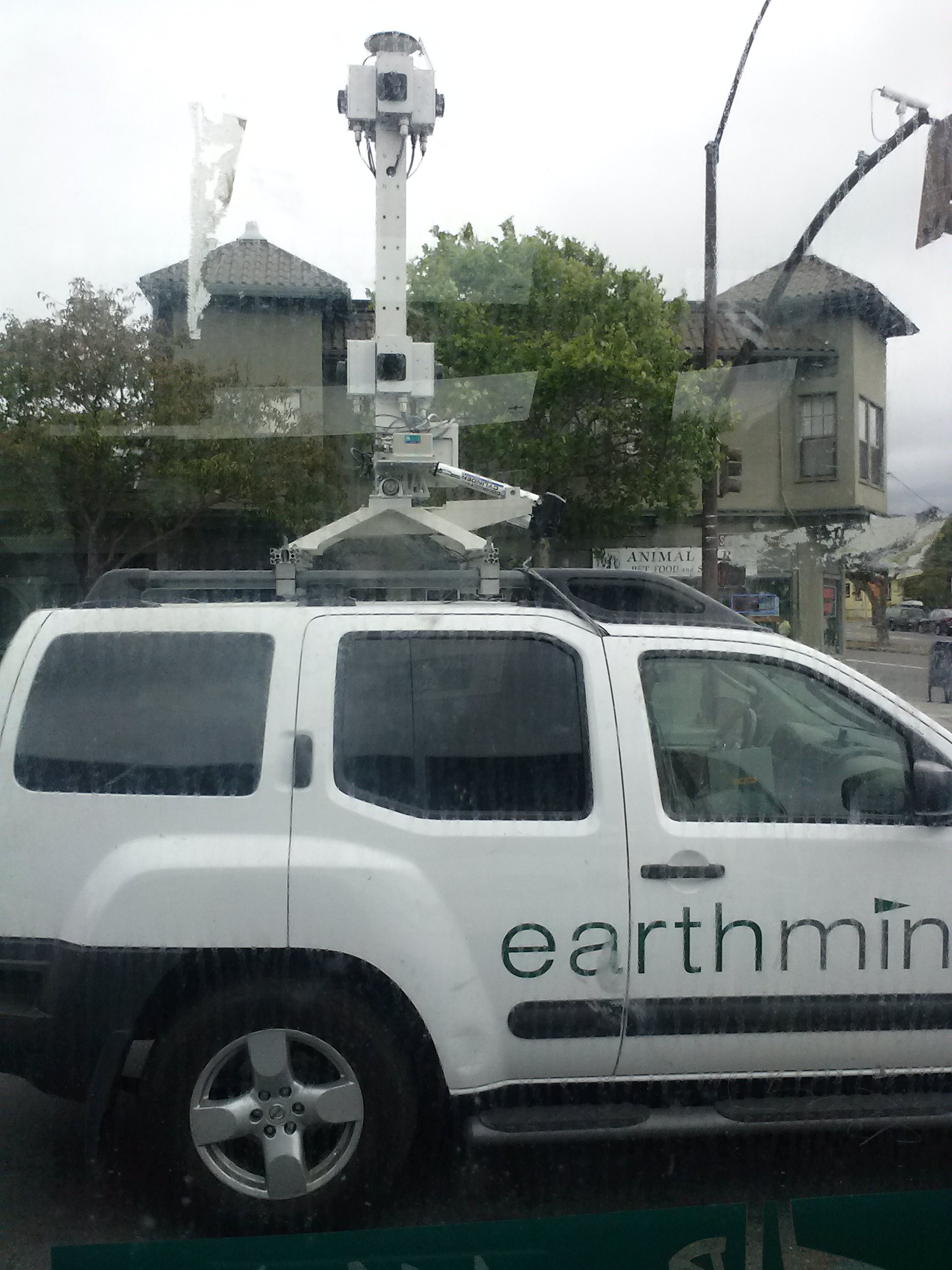
An Earthmine SUV on San Pablo Avenue, in Berkeley, California.

In May, 2009, earthmine introduced "Wild Style City", a web based model of San Francisco with surfaces where visitors can add graffiti to virtual walls.

In November, 2012 Nokia acquired earthmine's map service.

== Award ==
earthmine was the recipient of the 2007 Crunchie Award for "Best Technology Innovation/Achievement".

== See also ==
- EveryScape
- Eye2eye Software
- Google Street View
