= Immersive Media Company =

Digital imaging company

Immersive Media Company (IMC) was a digital imaging company specializing in spherical immersive video, founded in 1994. The parent company Immersive Ventures was headquartered in Kelowna, British Columbia with Immersive Media Company offices in Dallas, Texas. In 2011, Immersive Ventures acquired the assets of Immersive Media Company from Ember Clear and relaunched all products and services under the Immersive Media brand.

The company was acquired by Digital Domain in 2016.

== History ==
Immersive Media Company was founded in 1994. Director James Cameron was a co-founder.

In 1995 it created the world's first full motion, fully immersive video movie. The movie featured a basketball game where the camera was placed on a tripod on the court. The video was debuted at the 1995 SIGGRAPH convention in Los Angeles, California. Between 1994 and 2003, the company focused predominantly on research and development. In 2004, Immersive Media launched the Dodeca System, the first spherical camera that was all digital. In 2006, IMC launched the GeoImmersive City Collect project, sending Volkswagen Beetles equipped with camera systems to collect georeferenced video of major streets in cities within the United States and Canada.

IMC initially introduced the street view concept to Google, and delivered the first 35 cities which were viewed by more than 75 million people in the first four days. Google subsequently canceled its agreement with IMC and chose to build its own cameras for its on-going investment in immersive geo-media. Although street view imagery is displayed as stills by Google, IMC originally shot the footage as full-frame video, with backing film stills in .JPG format appearing as the video is paused. This is the method that IMC continues to use today for its street view and aerial coverage of cities.

In 2007, IMC acquired Freestone Systems, Inc. in Dallas, Texas, the manufacturer of the cameras. Their name was changed to IMC Sensors, Inc. In June 2007, IMC was named to the 2007 TSX Venture 50, a ranking of Canada's top emerging companies listed on the TSX Venture Exchange.

In 2008, IMC introduced "Patrol View", a military version of its street view technology and services to map Iraq and other theatres of war. Also in 2008, IMC innovated new production techniques for entertainment and sports productions culminating with an award-winning campaign for Mercedes-Benz; as well as producing a rarely seen music video for Grammy nominee Dierks Bentley.

In 2009, IMC's video platform was chosen by MapQuest in the launch of its new '360 View' service. In the same year, IMC introduced the world's first web-streaming live concert in 360-degree full motion interactive video using its new imLIVE(TM) server. Canada's Much On Demand music channel covered the concert and streamed Much's daily in-studio show.

The destruction following the January 2010 Haiti earthquake was covered by IMC. IMC donated its services and the video footage was used on news-gathering websites worldwide, and IMC's technology was covered in special features on CNN. The company similarly covered the 2010 Chile earthquake several months later.

In 2010, IMC covered the Vancouver Olympic Games for NBC, most notably by webcasting The Today Show live for two hours daily in full 360-degrees, along with other feature segments during the games. In other sports in 2010, IMC broadcast "Hockey Night in Canada" for Canadian Broadcasting (CBC Sports) live each week of the 2010 hockey season and during the 2010 season play-offs.

In 2010, Immersive Media (Calgary) changed its name to Ember Clear and closed down the Immersive Media operations. Two days after operations were ceased, former executive management of IMC formed Immersive Ventures and produced the first ever 360 mobile application for the Black Eyed Peas, BEP360, available on iTunes. In 2011, Immersive Ventures acquired the assets of Immersive Media Company from Ember Clear and relaunched all products and services under the Immersive Media brand.

In 2011, Immersive Media partnered with Livestream to produce the world's first live 360-degree stream of the Black Eyed Peas Concert from Central Park, New York City.

In April 2015, IMC entered into a partnership with Hollywood FX firm Digital Domain Holdings to create content, in a venture known as IM360.

In January 2016, IMC was acquired by Digital Domain for CA$100m.

== Products and services ==
Immersive Media's product platform and IP touch all areas of the production process, from capture, stitching, post production, distribution and play back. The first capture system was the Dodeca 2360, a camera named after the geodesic geometry of the Dodecahedron, on which the patent is based. The twelve-sided camera has eleven lenses which simultaneously record video. The twelfth side is the base of the camera. There is a base unit recording system which inputs the data and records video and other information onto hard drives. The imagery can be paired with metadata, such as time and GPS coordinates. There are now four different types of cameras depending on the type of environment and whether the production will be live or on demand and whether it will be streamed to the web, a mobile device or a set-top box.

Immersive Media focused on three markets: situational awareness, geographic information systems (GIS)/mapping, and entertainment and advertising for such client brands as Mercedes-Benz, Microsoft, Red Bull, Armani Jeans, the NBA, NBC Sports, Adidas, MTV and PEOPLE.

Its clients included Disney, Mountain Dew and Mercedes-Benz.

== Notable work ==
IMC produced FX for several movies, including co-founder James Cameron's Titanic, Pirates of the Caribbean, the X-Men series and Furious 7.

In the 2005 Inaugural Parade of George W. Bush, the U.S. Capitol Police used Immersive Media's camera on their car for security in the presidential motorcade. IMC cameras were also used for the 2009 inauguration of President Barack Obama.

Immersive Media had a camera underwater to survey coral reefs in Fiji with the Planetary Coral Reef Foundation in 2007.

In May 2007, Immersive Media's imagery was launched in Google Maps application "Google Street View". Immersive Media's street-level imagery displayed still-image panoramas of street images, although the actual imagery was collected as a video.

Immersive Media collaborated with the National Geographic Society and the Alaska Whale Foundation for their deployment of Crittercams on Humpback whales in Alaska in 2007.

Adidas used Immersive Media to capture David Beckham's first U.S. soccer game with the Los Angeles Galaxy in the summer of 2007. adidas also incorporated Immersive Media's imagery in a Fall 2007 marketing campaign titled "Basketball is a Brotherhood".

During 2007-8 Immersive Media embarked on their most ambitious productions for clients in the United States including Mercedes-Benz, Dierks Bentley, NBA Sports, NBC Sports, The Grammy Awards and People Magazine. Unlike their other single camera productions or "collects," the productions during this period were multi-camera productions featuring innovative lighting and sound solutions for 360 video. Post Production during this time period included compositing and visual effects to enhance the video footage which resulted in "story shaped" content and a new approach to film making. The entertainment division succeeded in achieving representation by William Morris Digital and in facilitating the creation of interactive video ad units with EyeWonder.

The Canadian Broadcasting Corporation uses the technology for broadcasting its weekly "Hockey Night in Canada" games.
