= VideoStreetView =

- Initial release: December 1, 2009
- Available in: French, English, German, Italian, Vietnamese and Arabic
- Website: VideoStreetView

VideoStreetView.com is known for being the first web-platform to publish a full-motion 360° immersive video StreetView. Its headquarter is based in Geneva, Switzerland. The company also has an office in Saïgon, Vietnam.

The technology used to realize a VideoStreetView is a 360° video capture of the street. The viewer deals with an interactive map in which he can move freely from the top, to the bottom and on the left and the right. Many hotspots and POI (points of interest) offers to the viewer more informations.

== History ==
GlobalVision is the company that originated the project. It was initially founded in 2003 by two brothers whom operated their business as a small student-driven structure. At the time of creation Marek Donnier was aged 23 and Jan-Mathieu Donnier was aged 20. The first public-released project website, PersoNews.com, a scalable city-guide and agenda, included more than 800 individual recreation structures and some 360° oneshot virtual tours.

In 2007, the company changed its name and legal structure and evolved to a limited liability company.

In 2008 it secured a partnership with Citroen and started its own StreetView project to map major cities in Switzerland. Several cameras are attached to the car’s roof and take pictures while the car is moving. GlobalVision acquired the domain names streetview.ch and videostreetview.com even before Google Street View stepped up in Europe.

The VideoStreetView.com website has been on a beta release since mid-2009, but was officially announced in December 2009.

Since 2014, a video street view is now possible from the sky. From the platform called Aerial GlobalVision, the viewer can see 360° panoramic aerial images. Those 360° panoramic are realized by using drones. The drone stabilized the camera to have a smooth images result. For now, it is possible to visit the city of Geneva and its environs, the Alps, Vietnam, Thailand and Singapore. As the Videostreetview, some hotspots and POI provide additional informations.

== VideoStreetView coverage ==
As of May 2013, videostreetview.com includes content in Dubai, Ho Chi Minh City, Ha Noi, and many areas in Switzerland. In its press release the company claims having covered 14'000 kilometers in Switzerland. According to immersive content already available on VideoStreetView, the mapping service currently covers the following areas of Switzerland:

Region	Major cities/areas
Argau	Aarwangen, Balstahl
Basel land	Birsfelden
Basel	Basel
Geneva	Geneva, Meyrin, Thônex, Carouge, Grand-Lancy, Vernier
Grisons	Chur
St-Gall	St-Gall, Wil, Oberuzwil
Thurgau	Frauenfeld, Weinfelden
Ticino	Bellinzone, Locarno, Lugano, Mendrisio
Vaud	Lausanne, Montreux, Vevey, Nyon
Valais	Martigny, Sion, Sierre
Zug	Zug
Zürich	Zürich
