= Tajueco =

- Municipality
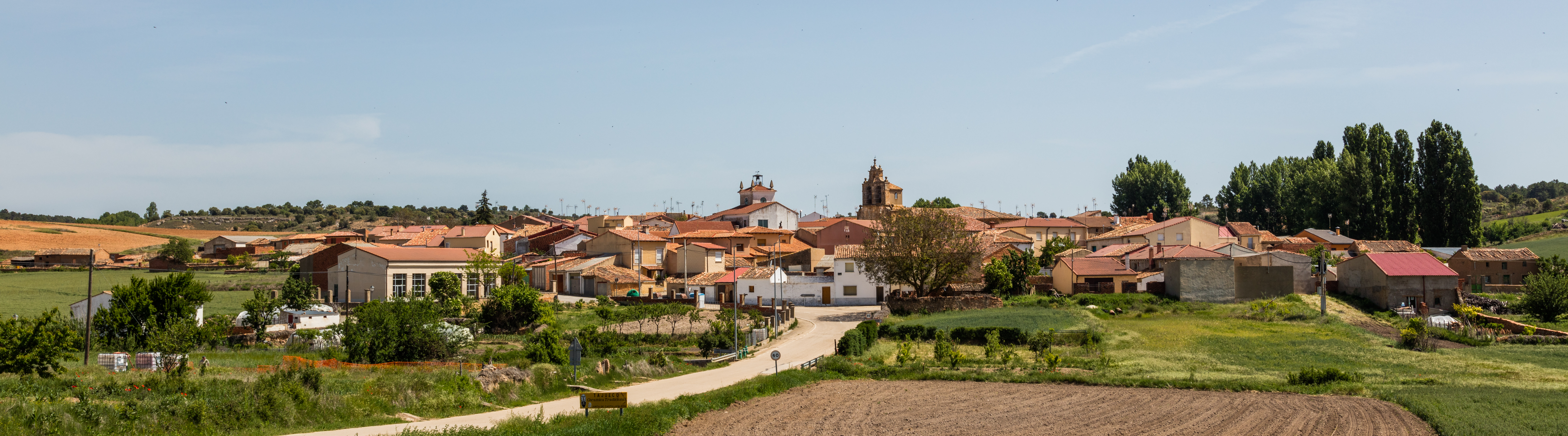

- Location in Spain. Tajueco (Spain)
- Coordinates: 41°32′11″N 2°50′56″W
- Country: Spain
- Autonomous community: Castile and León
- Province: Soria
- Municipality: Tajueco

Area
  - Total: 18 km^{2} (6.9 sq mi)

Population (2025-01-01)
  - Total: 61
  - Density: 3.4/km^{2} (8.8/sq mi)
- Time zone: UTC+1 (CET)
  - Summer (DST): UTC+2 (CEST)
- Website: Official website

Tajueco is a municipality located in the province of Soria, Castile and León, Spain. According to the 2004 census (INE), the municipality has a population of 109 inhabitants.

== 2024 murder ==
The village made international headlines in December 2024 after a Google Street View camera car captured an image of a murder suspect allegedly loading a dead body into the back of a Rover car. Two people were arrested in connection with the disappearance and death of a man who had been missing for over a year.
