= Potlatch (software) =

OpenStreetMap editor

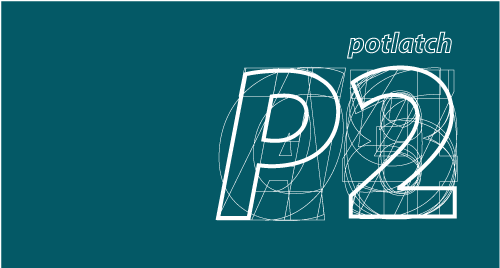

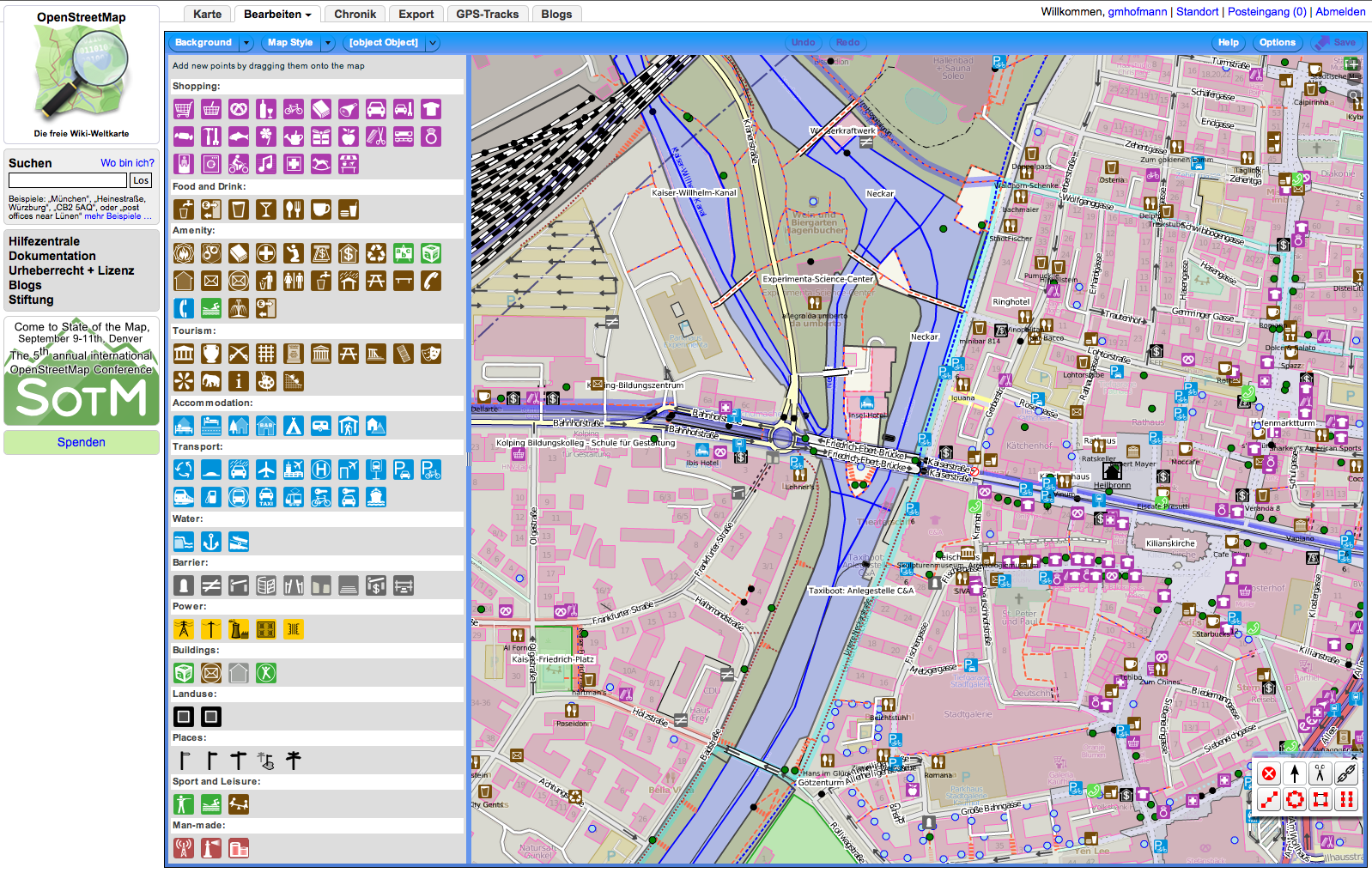
- Potlatch 2 with OpenStreetMap data
- Developer: Richard Fairhurst
- Stable release: 3.0 / December 30, 2020
- Written in: ActionScript
- Platform: Adobe AIR
- Available in: 94 languages
- Type: GIS software
- License: WTFPL
- Website: www.systemed.net/potlatch/
- Repository: github.com/systemed/potlatch3

Potlatch is an editing tool for OpenStreetMap using Adobe AIR. For many years embedded directly within the OpenStreetMap website using Adobe Flash, it was rebuilt as a desktop application following the end-of-lifing of Flash.

== History ==
Potlatch 1 was released mid 2006 and was the default editor on the main OpenStreetMap site until it was replaced by Potlatch 2 in April 2011. The name Potlatch came from the name of newsletter of the Lettrist International art collective.

Tim Berners-Lee demonstrated editing OpenStreetMap using Potlatch during his TED The next web talk in 2009.

An alpha version of Potlatch 2, a complete reimplementation of the software, was published in summer 2010. In April 2011, Potlatch 2 was released for general use. After Microsoft had granted OpenStreetMap permission to use aerial imagery from their Bing Maps service for tracing, Potlatch 2 was extended to display these images in the background.

iD began as a reimplementation of Potlatch 2 architecture in JavaScript. It replaced Potlatch 2 as the default editor on the OpenStreetMap-Website in 2013.

In 2020, the OpenStreetMap Foundation provided €2,500 funding for Potlatch to be ported to Adobe AIR, so that it could continue to run as a desktop application for Microsoft Windows and Apple Macintosh after Flash was disabled in web browsers. The desktop version was subsequently released as Potlatch 3.
