= Mapillary =

Service crowdsourcing geotagged photos

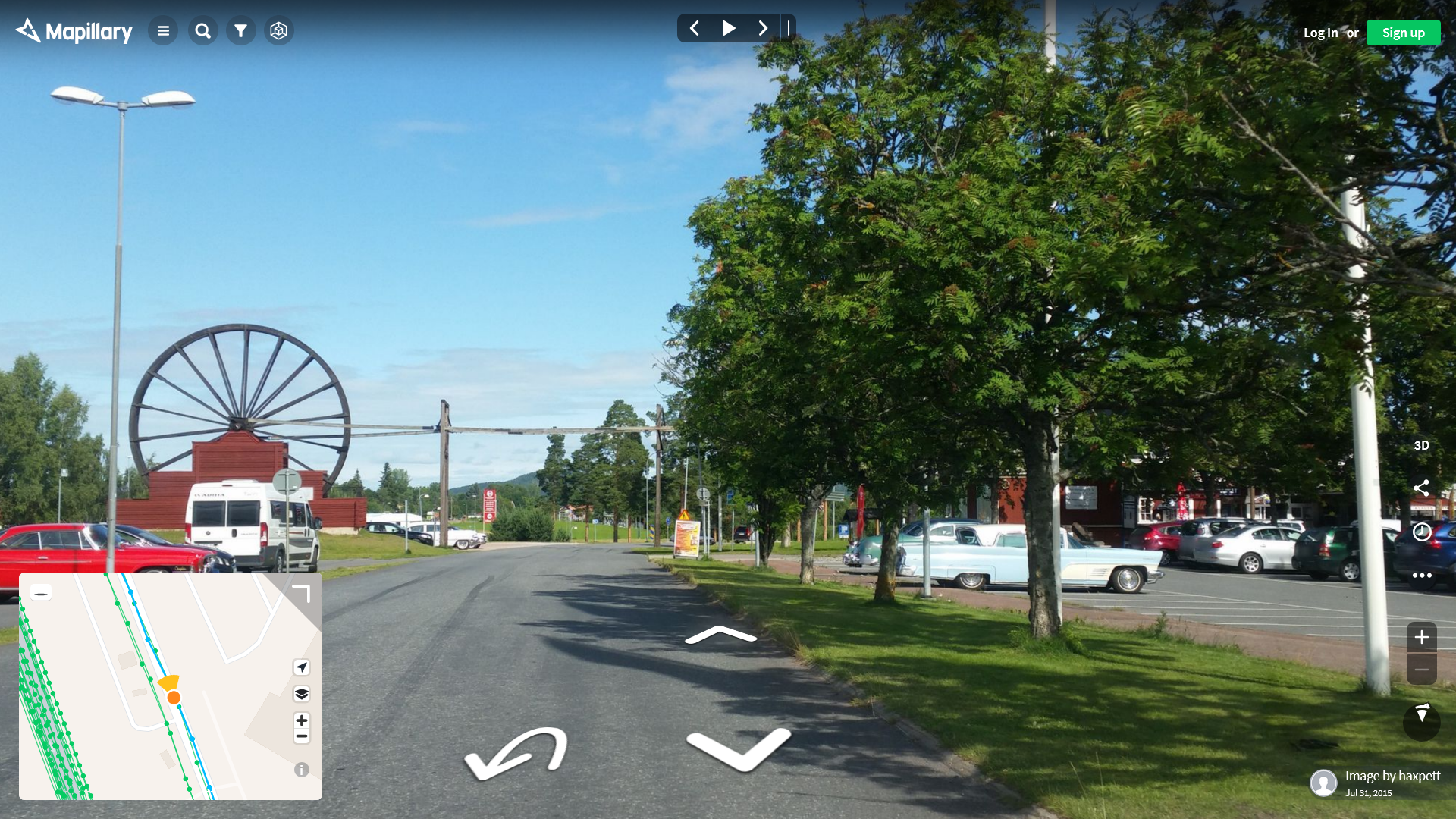
- Mapillary in 2025
- Developer: Meta Platforms, Inc.
- Release: September 2013; 13 years ago
- Operating system: Android; iOS
- Available in: English
- Type: Web mapping
- License: CC BY-SA
- Website: mapillary.com

Mapillary is a service for open-source sharing of crowdsourced geotagged photos, including 360° photos and street-level imagery similar to Google Street View. It is developed by remote company Mapillary AB, based in Malmö, Sweden. Mapillary was launched in 2013 and acquired by Meta Platforms, Inc. in 2020.

== History ==
Mapillary co-founders were Jan Erik Solem, Johan Gyllenspetz, Peter Neubauer and Yubin Kuang. According to Solem, Mapillary was founded to allow crowdsourcing of street-level imagery for use with computer vision.

The project started in September 2013, with an iPhone app released in November 2013, followed by an Android app released in January 2014.

Mapillary received $1.5 million in seed capital funding from a group of investors, led by Sequoia Capital in January 2015. In March 2016, it raised $8M additional funding (Atomico, Sequoia, LDV Capital, and PlayFair) for expanded operations, including more computer vision talent and a San Francisco office. In spring 2018, the company received $15M investment led by BMW i Ventures for a total estimated funding of $25M.

In September 2018, Mapillary announced a "collaboration" with Amazon to use the Rekognition visual data analysis platform to extract text from Mapillary's huge database of 350 million images. As large cities struggle to manage current street sign inventories, the first major project is identifying parking signs and extracting sign text for one large U.S. city, which will use the data to build a parking app to help save drivers time when searching for parking. In October 2018, the company made CNBC's annual list of top 100 start-ups to watch. In November 2018, Mapillary released a software development kit (SDK) allowing interested third-party software developers to integrate Mapillary image-capture functionality in their apps, opening the way for additional input channels.

In June 2020, Facebook acquired Mapillary for an undisclosed amount. After the acquisition, commercial use of Mapillary was made available free of charge. Due to Mapillary being widely used for contributing to OpenStreetMap and fears that Facebook might shut the service down, a tool was subsequently created for synchronizing data between Mapillary and KartaView (formerly OpenStreetCam). By November 14, over 55TiB or 30 million images had been transferred to KartaView.

== Features ==
Mapillary offers different capturing modes including walking, riding (either a bike or car), or panorama. On 10 September 2014, Mapillary announced that they now support panoramas and spherical photos.

As of May 2014, Mapillary had around 0.5 million photos and by December 2014, it had over 5.5 million. As of March 2015 it had 10 million photos, and by June 11, 2015, Mapillary had over 20 million photos. As of November 15, 2016 Mapillary had over 100 million photos. In August 2023 Mapillary reached 2 billion photos.

Mapillary images, millions

== Major dataset contributions ==
In 2018, Mapillary acquired major image datasets from two USA state transportation departments: approximately 5 million images each contributed by the Vermont Department of Transportation and the Arizona Department of Transportation.

== License ==
The images on Mapillary can be used under Creative Commons Attribution-ShareAlike 4.0 International License (CC BY-SA 4.0). There is special permission to derive data from the photos for contributing to OpenStreetMap and Wikimedia Commons. The GPX tracks can be used without restriction, and derived data can be used provided it is ODbL. The license was changed on 29 April 2014 from CC BY-NC to CC BY-SA.

== Research/datasets ==
In May 2017, Mapillary released an open source subset of its image dataset, the Mapillary Vistas Dataset of 25,000 street-level images, with pixel-wise annotation, to help train autonomous vehicle AI system algorithms. With data from 190 countries, they described it as "the world's largest, most diverse dataset for object recognition on street-level imagery" and offered it free for both academic and commercial researchers, but licensing is required for commercial product integration.

== Mapillary Tasker ==
On November 28, 2017, Mapillary released a beta tool known as the Mapillary Tasker. Mapillary Tasker "enables a task creator to tell other contributors where help is needed and what needs to be done." On the other hand, contributors can sort through the various tasks listed on the beta and work on whatever projects are interesting and feasible.

The tasks can range from "completing coverage, making map edits based on images, and verifying object detection," and separated between capture, map edit, and verification tasks on the actual tool. As a side note, because the tool is currently in beta, users have to send requests to be reviewed by Mapillary administrators, rather than having the autonomy to post whatever task you want assistance with.

== See also ==
- Google Street View
- KartaView
- List of street view services
- OpenStreetMap
- Web mapping
