= Location View =

- Developer: LocationView Co.
- Initial release: 22 June 2006
- Stable release: 4th generation / 1 September 2008
- Platform: Internet Explorer, Firefox, other GIS Software
- Available in: Japanese
- Website: locaview.com (inactive)

Location View was an interactive website developed by Tokyo-based company LocationView Co. offering registered users a street-level view of selected cities in Japan. It featured 360-degree horizontal and 180-degree vertical panning, zoom, and virtual mobility in which the user could control speed. Unlike other street view services, such as MapJack or Google Maps’ Streetview, Location View had a high frame rate and seamless transition between frames, enabling continuous, lifelike motion and surroundings which were animated rather than static. The site was developed by the Location View Co. and introduced on 14 May 2007 in Japan. When it was launched, several major cities in Japan, such as Tokyo, Yokohama, Kawasaki, Nagoya, Kyoto, Osaka and Himeji were included. It was since expanded to include the suburbs of a number of other Japanese cities. The service was closed down on 27 April 2009.

== Mapping technique ==
To obtain the massive amount of footage required to achieve coverage of dense Japanese urban areas, Location View hired retired taxicab drivers to drive around cities with camera-equipped vehicles. Location View images were updated every one to two years 8638128985. The fourth generation of Location View was introduced on 1 September 2008.

== Coverage ==
By September 2008, the following cities and areas were covered by the Location View web service.

- Akita, Akita
- Anamizu, Ishikawa
- Chiba, Chiba
- Fukui, Fukui
- Fukuoka, Fukuoka
- Himeji Castle (including interior images)
- Hiroshima
- Kamisu, Ibaraki
- Kashiwazaki, Niigata
- Kawasaki, Kanagawa
- Kitaazumi District, Nagano (Hakuba area)
- Kitakyushu
- Kyoto
- Minoh, Osaka
- Nagoya
- Nanao, Ishikawa
- Nara, Nara
- Noto, Ishikawa
- Osaka
- Saitama, Saitama (Ōmiya area)
- Seto, Aichi
- Shika, Ishikawa
- Tokyo
- Tomioka, Fukushima
- Tono, Iwate
- Toyota, Aichi
- Wajima, Ishikawa
- Yokohama
- Yoshinogawa, Tokushima
