= ID (software) =

Online editor for OpenStreetMap

iD

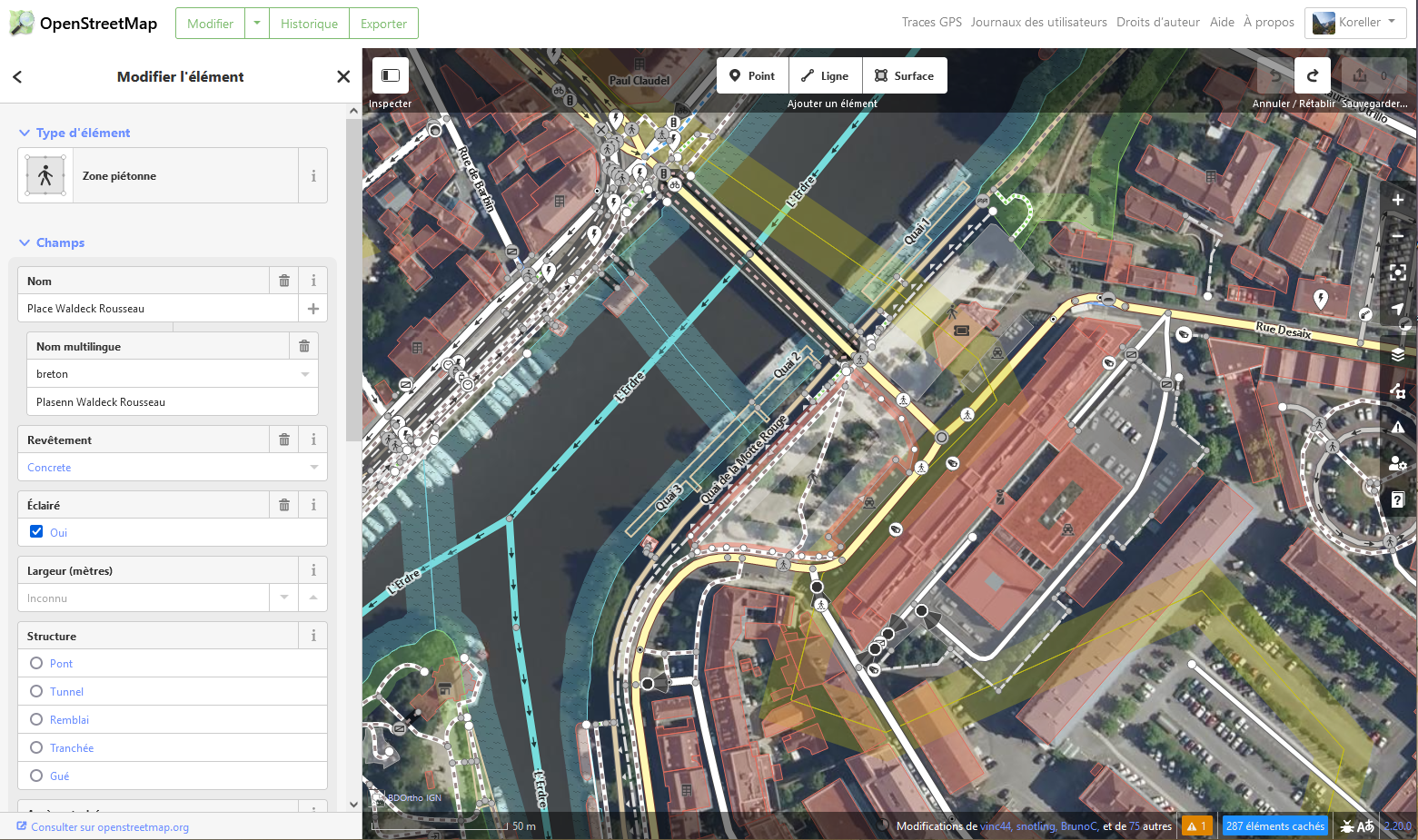
- Original authors: Richard Fairhurst, Tom MacWright, John Firebaugh, Saman Bemel-Benrud, Ansis Brammanis
- Developer: Multiple contributors
- Release: May 7, 2013; 13 years ago
- Stable release: 2.42.3 / 20 October 2026; 20 days ago
- Written in: JavaScript
- Platform: Web browser
- Available in: 78 languages
- Type: GIS software
- License: ISC
- Website: ideditor.com
- Repository: https://github.com/openstreetmap/iD

iD is a free software online editor for OpenStreetMap (OSM) geodata created in JavaScript and released in 2013. It is the most popular and the default editor on the main OSM page. iD's features include choosing custom aerial imagery and native support for Mapillary photos.

== History ==
Prior to iD, the primary web editor for OpenStreetMap data was the Flash-based Potlatch 2 editor. The iD editor project was founded by the author of Potlatch 1 and 2, Richard Fairhurst, online on July 13, 2012 and at the State of the Map conference on October 14, 2012.

In September 2012, the Knight Foundation announced the winners of the Knight News Challenge: Data competition. The team from Development Seed/Mapbox was selected as a winner for their proposal to develop new contribution tools for OpenStreetMap and was awarded a grant of $575,000.

This editor was meant to be a Potlatch 2 architecture reimplementation in JavaScript with redesigned user interface. The only big internal change was a departure from XML tagging preset architecture to a JSON-based one.

In 2013, iD became the default editor on OSM.org, making it the most used OSM editor by changeset count.

== Forks ==
iD has spawned several forks for specialized use cases. In 2018, Facebook created RapiD, with provided access to machine learning–generated roads and buildings under the name MapWithAI, which users could verify before uploading to OSM. In 2023, RapiD was renamed Rapid and MapWithAI renamed Rapid Assist.
