= Eye2eye Software =

British educational software publisher

Eye2eye Software Ltd is a UK educational software publisher, which has systematically photographed Britain in 360 degree panoramas and stills, publishing the collection as the school resource and home reference Eye2eye Britain. Using a portable panoramic camera developed by themselves they have followed a 'points of interest' approach – taking panoramas on mountains, beaches, inside buildings, factories, heritage sites, etc., rather than a street (car) based approach like Google street view.

== History ==
- Eye2eye Software Ltd, based in Cambridge, England, was founded in 1998 by Martin Clemoes, son of the late Peter Clemoes. Eye2eye Britain may have been partly inspired by 1986 BBC Domesday Project developed by Acorn Computers Ltd where Martin worked before.
- November 1998 - first edition of Eye2eye Britain (1.0) published. Supplied on CD-ROM, this mapped out Britain in 10,000 digital photos (no panoramas). Each photo is captioned and indexed using metadata, e.g. topic, date of heritage sites on a timeline, as well as map location.
- In 1999 there was press interest in Eye2eye Britain.
  - The Guardian started an article CoastBusters with the line "Ever had an urge to explore the entire coastline of mainland Britain? Put away that sou'wester and boot up your PC instead. For a round trip from John O'Groats to John O'Groats, it's not rainwear you need, but software."
  - Personal Computer World subtitled a review with "A hugely impressive reference work that focuses on places of note in the British Isles".
- First Panoramic Edition of Eye2eye Britain was published in January 2005. Added 950 full screen 360 by 105-degree panoramas, of England from Leeds in Yorkshire South, to 10,000 photos.
- 2005-06 - Consumer press critical, better feedback for education.
- Before 2007 launch of Google street view, consumer press did not see appeal of exploring with panoramas - e.g. 5 May Computer Shopper review ending with "As no information is provided for people who want to visit the places featured in Eye2eye Britain, it's more suitable as an educational product than for use by day-trippers or holiday-makers. With whiteboards becoming widely used in UK schools, education press more enthusiastic, e.g. in 6 December Education Guardian article called Bring maps to life and save the world.
- January 2010 - Latest edition - Eye2eye Britain Panoramic 5 - published. 1,500 panoramas and 10,800 photos now cover mainland England, Wales and Scotland plus the largest of Britain's many islands. Edition 5 also supports other school needs such as Virtual learning environment.

== Panorama technology ==
Eye2eye's approach to panoramic photography depends on two technologies they have developed themselves:

1. A portable panoramic camera system capturing a 360 by 105 degree panorama in a single click.
2. Panorama rendering software for the PC that syncs with screen refresh, rendering a perspective view frame for each screen refresh (e.g. 60 frames per second) for smooth panorama movement.

This technology has shaped their approach to panorama-photographing Britain. They have used their portable camera system to capture points of interest panoramas on foot, e.g. interiors, beaches, tower-top or mountain-top views. Single-click capture copes well with places with movement, e.g. crowds, waves on beach. This approach has the advantage of covering places of [inter]national interest, but the disadvantage of being labour-intensive, so the quantity of panoramas (currently around 1,500) is less than in car-based projects like Google Street View. Eye2eye have also been able to write captions and indexes for each panorama.
