= NLnet =

NLnet can refer to:

- NLnet Foundation
- NLnet Labs
