= EveryScape =

- Founded: 2002
- Founder: Mok Oh
- Headquarters: Waltham, Massachusetts
- Key people: Jim Schoonmaker (CEO)
- Website: www.everyscape.com

EveryScape is an online mapping service based in Waltham, Massachusetts. It allows users to view panoramic images from various locations and is a competitor of Google's Street View service.

== History ==
EveryScape was founded in 2002 by Mok Oh in Newton, Massachusetts, and was originally called Mok 3.

In 2005, the company raised $4.5 million in Series A funding.

In May 2007, EveryScape unveiled a demo of its service in San Francisco. On October 29, 2007, the company debuted its service in Boston, New York, Miami, and Aspen, Colorado. The service included 360 degree panoramic views of the cities, and allowed users to contribute indoor and outdoor photographs to its maps.

EveryScape expanded its service to Lexington, Massachusetts, in December 2007, to Cambridge, Massachusetts, on January 17, 2008, and to Laguna Beach, California, a week later on January 24, 2008.

On April 7, 2008, EveryScape added Philadelphia, San Francisco, and Washington, D.C. Later in the month, Beverly Hills was added.

In March 2008, the company secured $7 million in Series B funding for expansion.

In February 2010, the company raised $6 million in Series C funding.

In December 2010, EveryScape formed a partnership with Bing to develop an “Interior Views” feature on Bing Maps. The feature allowed users to explore the inside of buildings.
