= Google Street View =

Interactive street panorama technology

- A road junction in Manchester, England, showing nine different angles
- Release: May 25, 2007; 19 years ago

Stable release(s) [±]
- Android: 2.0.0.387140768 / August 9, 2021; 5 years ago
- iOS: 2.17.3 / May 17, 2021; 5 years ago
- Online: Release 2007 (see list)
- Platform: Android, iOS, web
- Available in: Multiple languages
- Website: google.com/streetview

Google Street View is a technology featured in Google Maps and Google Earth that provides interactive panoramas from positions along many streets in the world. Google Street View displays street-level imagery of stitched VR photographs. Most photography is captured by specially equipped cars, but other means have been used, including over- and underwater vehicles, as well as on foot.

First launched in 2007 in several cities in the United States, Street View has since expanded to include all of the country's major and minor cities, as well as the cities and rural areas of many other countries worldwide. As of 2017, Street View had coverage in 83 countries. Street View has been used for research in fields like urban analytics and geographic information science, as well as in artistic work.

== History ==
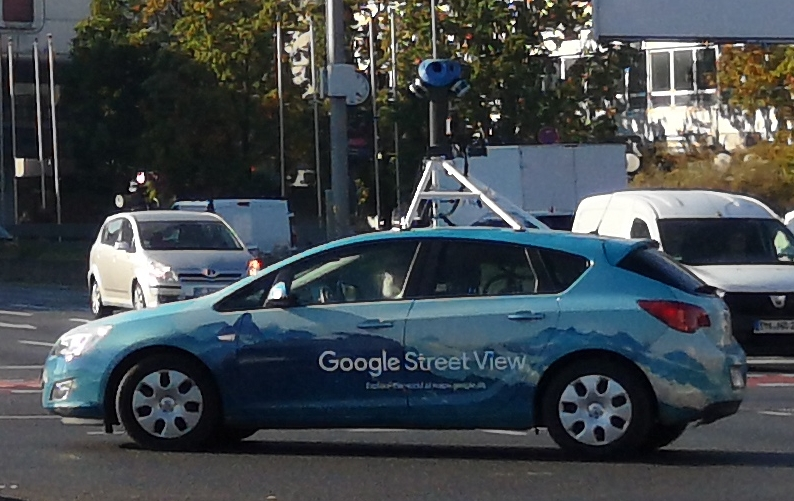
Google Street View car in Germany

Street View had its inception in 2001 with the Stanford City Block Project, a Google-sponsored Stanford University research project. The project ended in June 2006, and its technology was folded into Street View. The technology was launched on May 25, 2007, in the United States.

In May 2008, Google announced that it was testing face-blurring technology on its photos of the streets of Manhattan. The technology uses a computer algorithm to search Google's image database for faces and blur them. Street View was integrated into Google Earth 4.3, the Maps application on the Apple iPhone, and the Maps application for the S60 3rd Edition. In November, the drag-and-drop Pegman icon was introduced as the primary user interface element for connecting from Maps' 2D view into Street View's 3D view. When Pegman is dropped onto a particular set of coordinates in Google Maps for which Street View data is available, Street View opens and takes over the whole map window.

In 2009, a full-screen option and Smart Navigation were introduced. Smart Navigation allows users to navigate around the panoramas by double-clicking with their cursor on any place or object they want to see. In May 2011, indoor views of businesses (Google Business Photos) were announced. After the pilot phase of several months, the project was rolled out in autumn.

With the release of Android 4.2 in November 2012, Google invited users to contribute panoramas of their own using supported devices. Google highlights user-contributed panoramas with blue circle icons on Maps. The company also created a website to highlight places in the world where one can find them. In 2013, businesses such as shops, cafés and other premises can pay a photographer to take panoramic images of the interior of their premises, which were then included in Street View. Google sets up a program to let third parties borrow the Street View Trekker (a backpack-mounted camera). Business interior views are shown as small orange circles. In 2014, Street-level imagery from the past can now be optionally seen, if available, for a given street view.

In 2015, a partnership was announced between Street View and the environmental monitoring company Aclima. Cars carry sensors to detect pollutants such as nitrogen dioxide, ozone, and particulates. In October, support for Google Cardboard was announced, allowing users to utilize Street View in 360-degree virtual reality.

In 2017, imagery inside the International Space Station was added to Street View. In August 2017, Google also allowed users to create their own Street View-like blue paths for the connected photospheres that are sufficiently close to one another.

On September 5, 2017, Google announced that they were improving the quality of the street view panoramic photo by revamping its mapping vehicles with all-new high-resolution camera systems and artificial intelligence. The new Google cars have been seen in various American cities since March 2017, as well as in Japan since August. The first images taken with the new generation of cameras were available online on September 13. In October 2017, the makers of the Insta360 Pro announced the certification of the first "Street View auto ready" camera for US$3,500; it uses six lenses for a 360° view and comes with Stitcher software. In addition to purchase, the camera rig is also available to qualified entities as part of the Google loaner program, with 50 cameras available to loan.

In 2018, Japan now offers the street view from a dog's perspective. In August 2018, Street View covered two offshore gas-extraction platforms in the North Sea.

On December 3, 2020, Google announced that users could contribute to Street View by capturing video using their augmented reality-supported phones using the Street View app. Google shut down its dedicated Street View app on Android and iPhone and ended support on March 21, 2023. The Street View app allowed users to take and publish their own 360° photos. Google says that users can still upload 360° photos using StreetView Studio.

== Implementation ==
Street View is available as a component of Google Maps and Google Earth, as a web application, and as a mobile application for Android and iOS. Originally, Google Maps used Adobe Flash for Street View. Google overhauled Google Maps in 2013. The newer version uses JavaScript extensively and provides a JavaScript application programming interface. At the time of their release, the new Google Maps and Street View were measured slower than the old version in various setups. A user can switch to the old version of Google Maps.

The drag-and-drop Pegman icon is the primary user interface element used by Google to connect Maps to Street View. Its name comes from its resemblance to a clothespeg. When not in use, Pegman sits atop or beside the Google Maps zoom controls. Occasionally, Pegman "dresses up" for special events or is joined by peg friends in Google Maps. When dragged into Street View near Area 51, he becomes a flying saucer, and when dragged near the Florida Keys or Hawaii, he becomes a mermaid. When viewing older views, the Pegman in the minimap changes to Doc Brown from Back to the Future. At Loch Ness, Pegman turns into Nessie wearing a tartan hat, where Street View includes coverage of the lake itself as well as the nearby A82 road and rural areas.

== Coverage ==
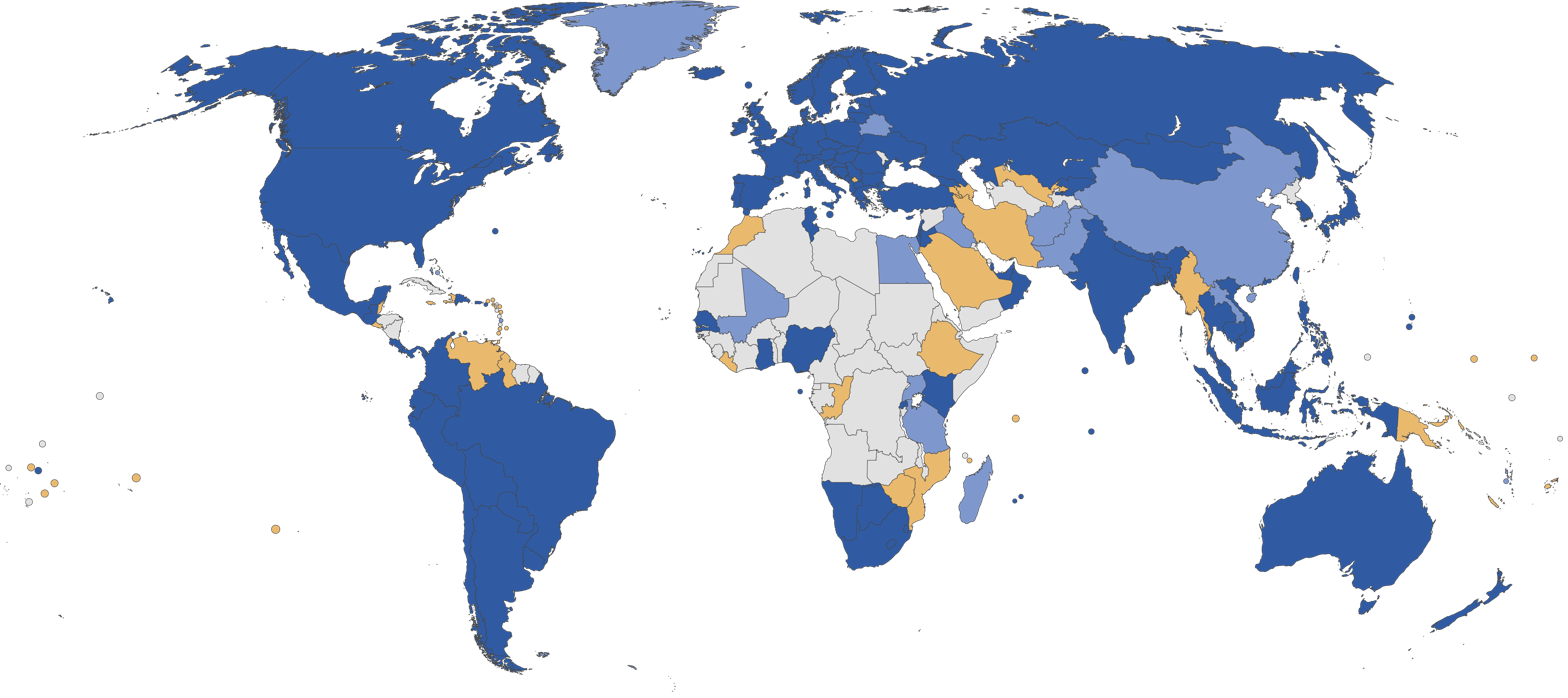
Countries & dependencies with full, official coverage Countries and dependencies with minor/secluded official coverage Countries and dependencies with notable unofficial coverage Countries and dependencies without current coverage

Google announced in May 2017 that it had captured more than 10 million miles (16 million kilometers) of Street View imagery across 83 countries. Maps also include panoramic views taken underwater such as in West Nusa Tenggara underwater coral, in the Grand Canyon, inside museums, and Liwa Desert in United Arab Emirates, which is viewed from camelback. In a ten-day trek with Apa Sherpa, Google documented Khumbu, Nepal with its Mount Everest, Sherpa communities, monasteries and schools.

Google also added landmarks in Egypt, including the Pyramids of Giza, Cairo Citadel, Saqqara, Monastery of Saint Mina, and the Citadel of Qaitbay in the 9 September 2014 release.

In June 2022, Google announced the company is relaunching their Street View service in India. The announcement came six years after the feature was banned in India over security concerns. The company has partnered with local technology businesses Tech Mahindra and Genesys to aid in the relaunch of the service. As of July 2022, the service is live in 10 cities in India.

Official coverage made by Google (excluding third parties or unofficial)
Region	Normal street coverage	Landmark coverage
East Asia	Japan, Hong Kong, Macau, Mongolia, South Korea, Taiwan	China
Southeast Asia	Cambodia, Indonesia, Laos, Malaysia, Philippines, Singapore, Thailand, Vietnam	
South Asia	Bangladesh, Bhutan, India, Nepal, Sri Lanka	Afghanistan, Pakistan
Central Asia	Kazakhstan, Kyrgyzstan	
West Asia	Cyprus, Israel, Jordan, Oman, Palestine, Qatar, Turkey, United Arab Emirates,	Iraq
North Africa	Tunisia	Egypt
Central Africa	São Tomé and Príncipe	
West Africa	Ghana, Nigeria, Senegal	Mali
East Africa	Kenya, Réunion, Rwanda, Uganda	British Indian Ocean Territory, Madagascar, Tanzania
Southern Africa	South Africa, Lesotho, Eswatini, Botswana, Namibia	
Western Europe	Austria, Belgium, France, Germany, Liechtenstein, Luxembourg, Monaco, Netherlands, Switzerland	
Northern Europe	Denmark, Estonia, Faroe Islands, Finland, Iceland, Ireland, Isle of Man, Jersey, Latvia, Lithuania, Norway, Sweden, United Kingdom	
Southern Europe	Albania, Andorra, Bosnia and Herzegovina, Croatia, Gibraltar, Greece, Italy, Kosovo, Malta, Montenegro, North Macedonia, Portugal, San Marino, Serbia, Slovenia, Spain	
Eastern Europe	Bulgaria, Czechia, Georgia, Hungary, Poland, Romania, Russia, Slovakia, Ukraine	Belarus
North America	Bermuda, Canada, Greenland, United States	St. Pierre and Miquelon
Central America	Costa Rica, Guatemala, Mexico, Panama	
Caribbean	Curaçao, Dominican Republic, Puerto Rico, US Virgin Islands	Martinique
South America	Argentina, Bolivia, Brazil, Chile, Colombia, Ecuador, Paraguay, Peru, Uruguay	Falkland Islands, South Georgia and the South Sandwich Islands
Australia and New Zealand	Australia, Christmas Island, Cocos (Keeling) Islands, New Zealand	
Melanesia		Vanuatu
Micronesia	Guam, Northern Mariana Islands	
Polynesia	American Samoa	Pitcairn Islands
Antarctica		Antarctica

== Data capturing equipment ==
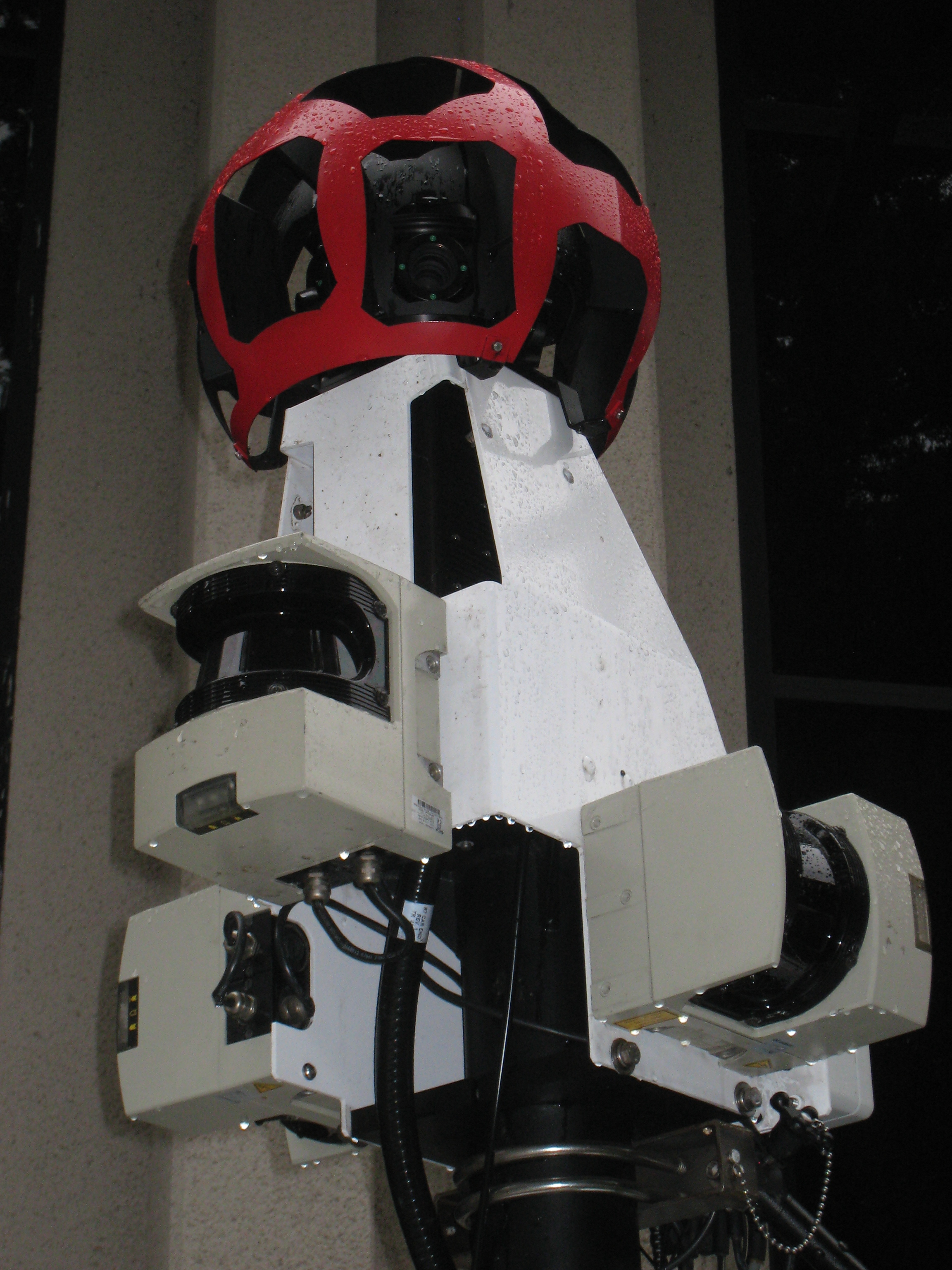
Street View camera

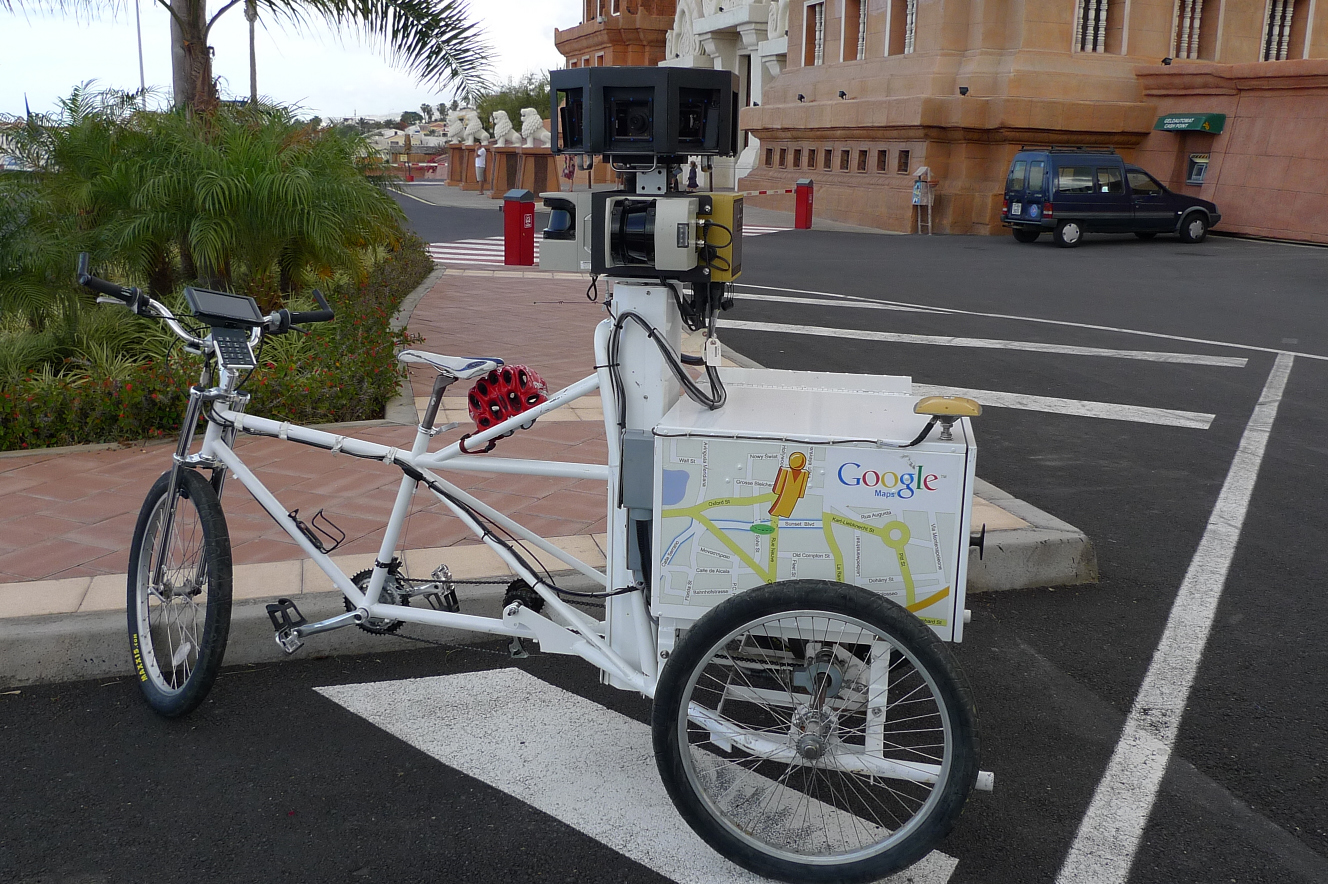
A Google Street View trike

Street View imagery has come from several generations of camera systems from Immersive Media Company, Point Grey Research (now FLIR Systems), and in-house. The cameras contain no mechanical parts, including the shutter; instead, they used CMOS sensors and an electronic rolling shutter. Widely deployed versions are:

- R2: the earliest after Immersive Media. The photos were captured with a ring of eight 11-megapixel CCD sensors with commercial photographic wide-angle lenses, cameras with the same specifications as those used for the Google Books project.
- Ladybug2 cameras (resolution 1024 × 768 pixels) by Point Grey Research.
- R5: uses a ring of eight 5-megapixel CMOS cameras by Elphel with custom low-flare lenses, plus a camera with a fisheye lens on top to capture upper levels of buildings.
- R7: the first completely in-house-built camera; it uses 15 of the same sensors and lenses as R5, without the fisheye effect.

Data-recording equipment is usually mounted on the roof of a car. A trike (tricycle) was developed to record pedestrian routes, including Stonehenge and other UNESCO World Heritage Sites. In 2010, a snowmobile-based system captured the 2010 Winter Olympics sites. Shopping trolleys have also been used to shoot the insides of museums, and in Venice, the narrow roads were photographed with backpack-mounted cameras, and canals were photographed from boats. A portable backpack-mounted Google Trekker is used in outdoor terrain. For instance, the six main paths up Snowdon, United Kingdom, were mapped by the Google Trekker in 2015.

In 2017, Google used eight 20-megapixel cameras. Two cameras were facing left and right to read street signs and business names. Laser range scanners from Sick AG for measuring up to 50 meters at 180° in the front of the vehicle are used for recording the actual dimensions of the space being photographed. LIDAR scanners from Velodyne were added in the 2017 update. It is mounted at 45° to capture three-dimensional depth information and positional information. Accurate positioning was done via a Global Positioning System, a wheel speed sensor, and inertial navigation sensor data.

In September 2018, Google announced it would integrate air quality sensors from Aclima into its global fleet of Street View vehicles.

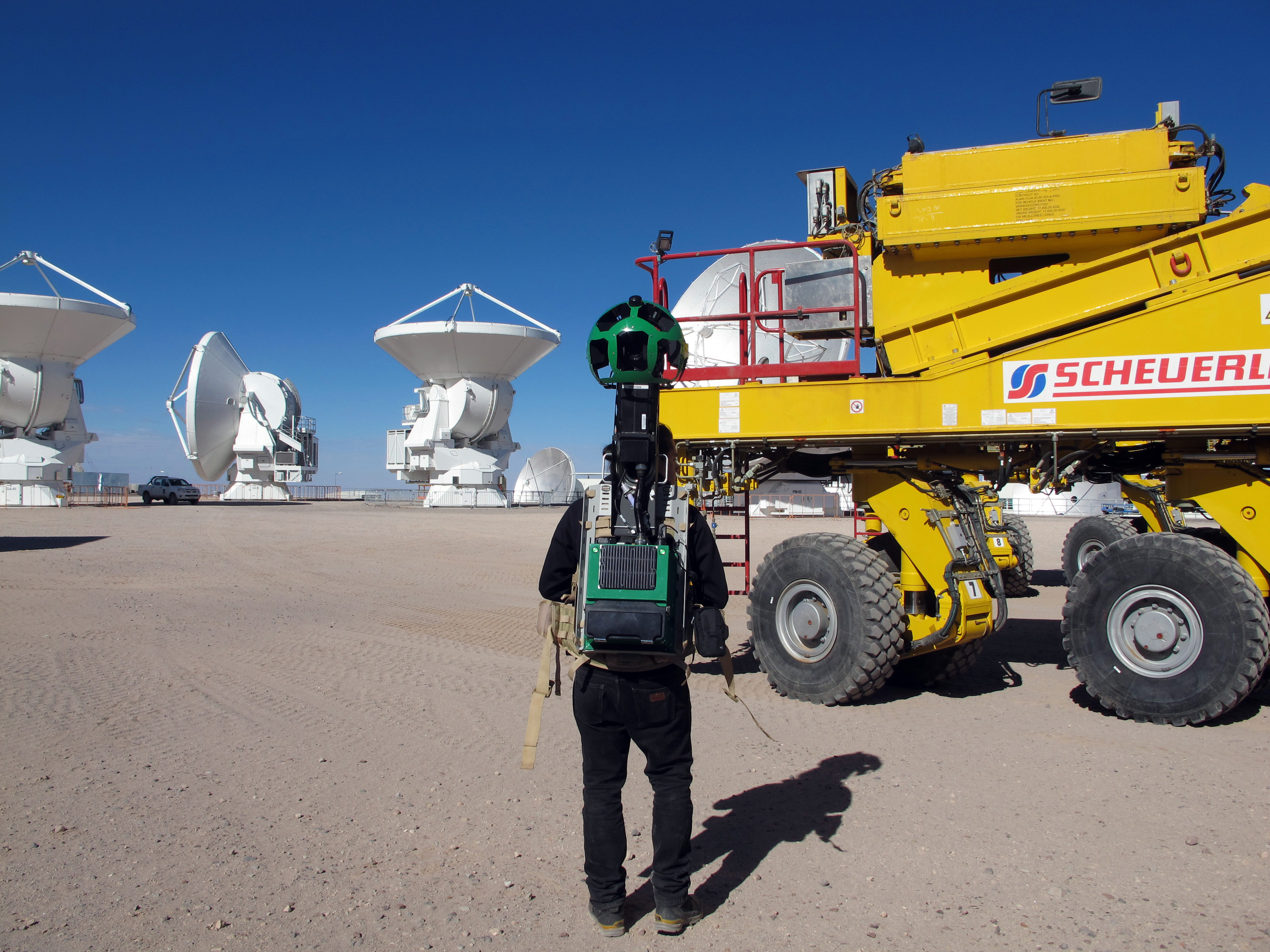
A Street View Trekker backpack-mounted camera

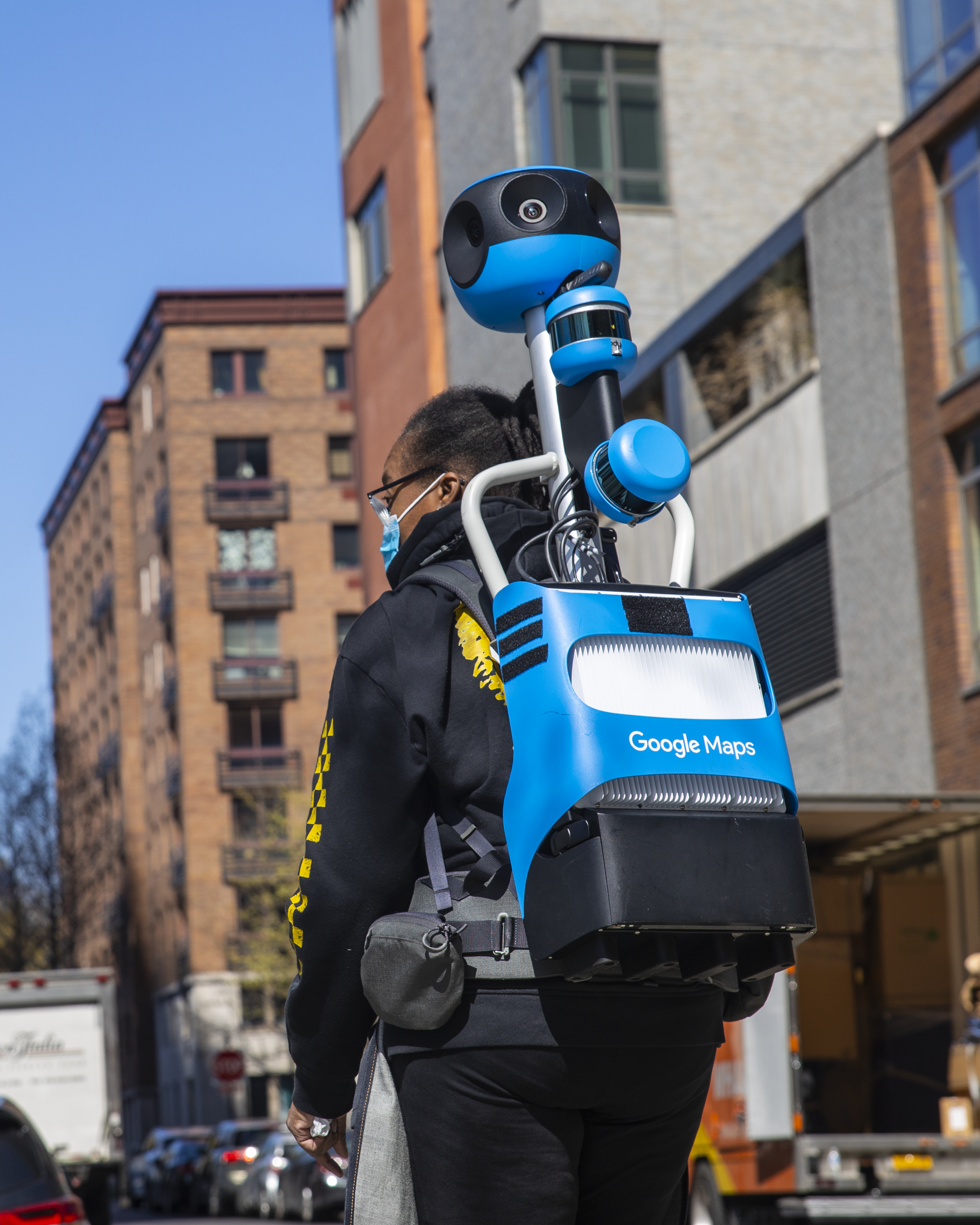
Google Maps Street View Trekker backpack being implemented on the sidewalk of the Hudson River Greenway in New York City

== Privacy concerns ==
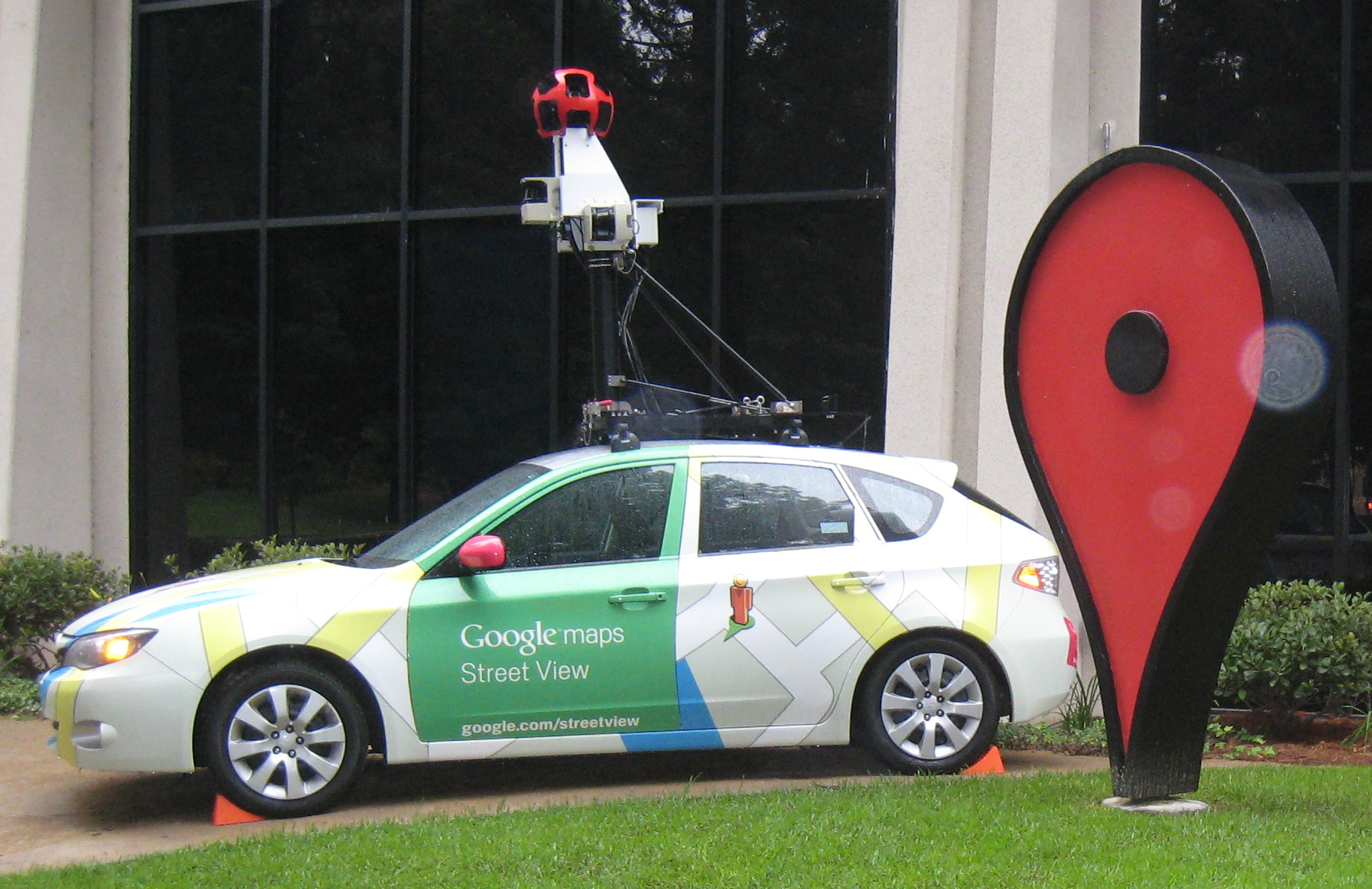
A Google Street View car was showcased on the Google campus in Mountain View, California, in October 2010.

Google Street View will blur content for any user who makes a request, in addition to the automatic blurring of faces and license plates. Privacy advocates have objected to Google Street View, pointing to views found to show men leaving strip clubs, protesters at an abortion clinic, sunbathers in bikinis, and people engaging in activities visible from public property that they do not wish to be seen publicly. Another concern is the height of the cameras, and in at least four countries, Japan Switzerland, Sri Lanka and Liechtenstein, Google has had to lower the height of its cameras so as to not peer over fences and hedges. The service also allows users to flag inappropriate or sensitive imagery for Google to review and remove. On the other side of the blurring issue are those who wish their home or property to be unblurred. As of 2023, there is no process to have an image or object in Street View unblurred.

Police Scotland received an apology for wasting police time in 2014 from a local business owner in Edinburgh who, in 2012, staged a fake murder for the Google camera car by lying in the road "while his colleague stood over him with a pickaxe handle". In May 2010, it was revealed that Google had collected and stored payload data from unencrypted Wi-Fi connections as part of Street View.

In November 2024, Spanish police arrested two people in connection with a man's disappearance and death after discovering a Google Street View image—captured in October in the village of Tajueco, Soria—that appears to show a person loading a large object into the trunk of a car.

The concerns have led to Google not providing or suspending the service in countries around the world.

- Austria: Google Street View was banned in Austria, because Google was found to collect Wi-Fi data without authorization in 2010. After the ban was lifted, rules were set up for how Street View can operate legally in Austria. Google resumed collecting imagery in 2017. As of 2018 Google Street View is available in select areas of Austria.
- Australia: In 2010, Google Street View ceased operations in Australia, following months of investigations from Australian authorities. However, this cessation has since ended, with Google announcing plans to continue production on May 4, 2011 and subsequently releasing updated Street View imagery for Australian towns and cities on July 27, 2011.
- Germany: In 2011, having put online pictures of the 20 largest cities, Google stopped taking Street View images in Germany. However, as of mid-2020, Google's website shows numerous areas of Germany as being scheduled for coverage by Street View vehicles over the ensuing months. As of 2024, Germany has partial street coverage.
- India: In 2011, Google stopped taking street images in India, after receiving a letter from police authorities in Bangalore. However, in 2022, Google announced Street View in eight Indian cities, including Bangalore.
- Canada: Street View cars were spotted as early as September 2007 in Montreal. However, service for Canada was delayed while they attempted to settle with the Canadian government over its privacy laws. Privacy and town beauty concerns were dealt with and Street View is available in Montreal and other Canadian cities (as of 2016).

== Third-party use of images ==
Imagery obtained from Google Street View has been used for research purposes, e.g., quantifying greenery, health studies, and assessing cycling conditions.

Fine-art photographers have selected images for use in their own work. The images have been published in book form and exhibited in art galleries, such as the work of Jon Rafman at the Saatchi Gallery, London. Rafman sees images that evoke the "gritty urban life" depicted in American street photography and the images commissioned by the Farm Security Administration. He was inspired by the aesthetic of Henri Cartier-Bresson.

Michael Wolf won an honorable mention in Daily Life in the 2011 World Press Photo competition for some of his work using Google Street View. Mishka Henner was shortlisted for the 2013 Deutsche Börse Photography Prize in November 2012 for his series 'No Man's Land', which depicts sex workers at rural roadside locations. Canadian artist Sylvia Grace Borda worked in conjunction with John M. Lynch between 2013 and 2014 to insert the first staged tableaux into the Google Street View engine. It won them the Lumen Prize in 2016. Borda has independently continued to author the Google Street View engine, and in 2017, she created the tableaux series the Kissing Project.

Swedish programmer Anton Wallén developed a game called GeoGuessr, which places players in a Google Street View and has them guess its location. In 2022, competitive players went viral, prompting a New York Times feature on top players.

== Gallery ==
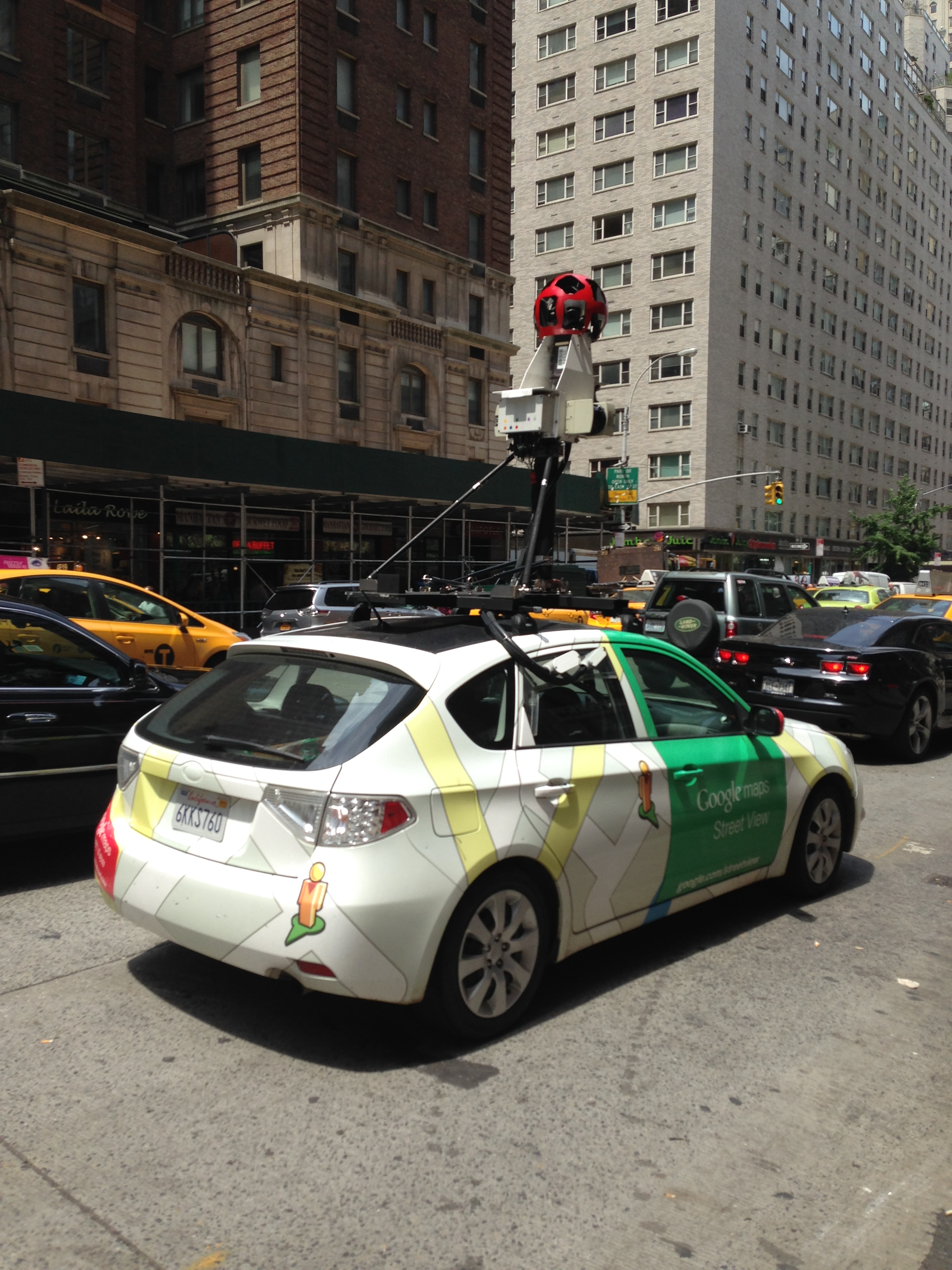
The cameras of this Google Street View car are mounted on the roof rack. The power and data cables are fed into the car through the right rear passenger window.

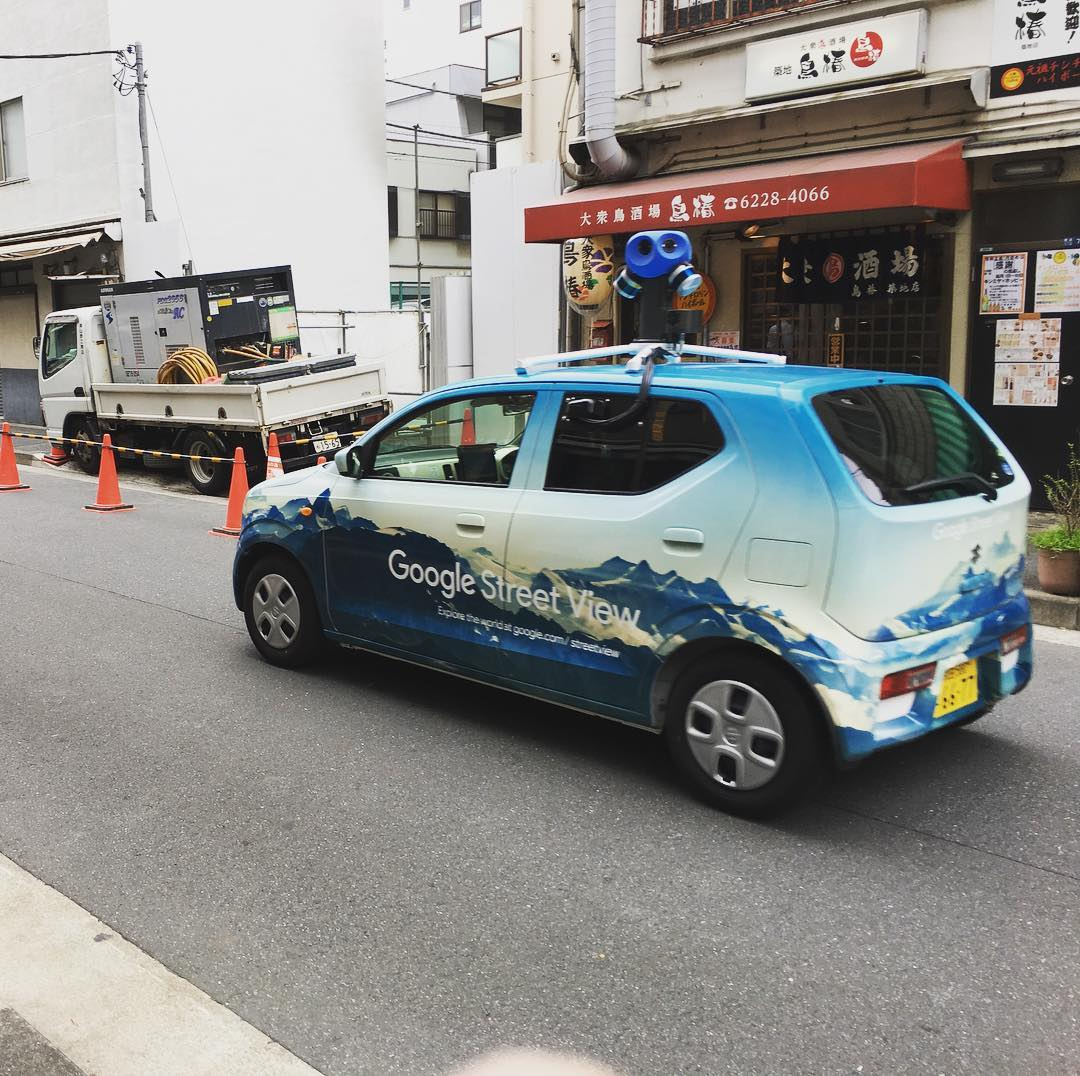
A Google Street View car in Japan

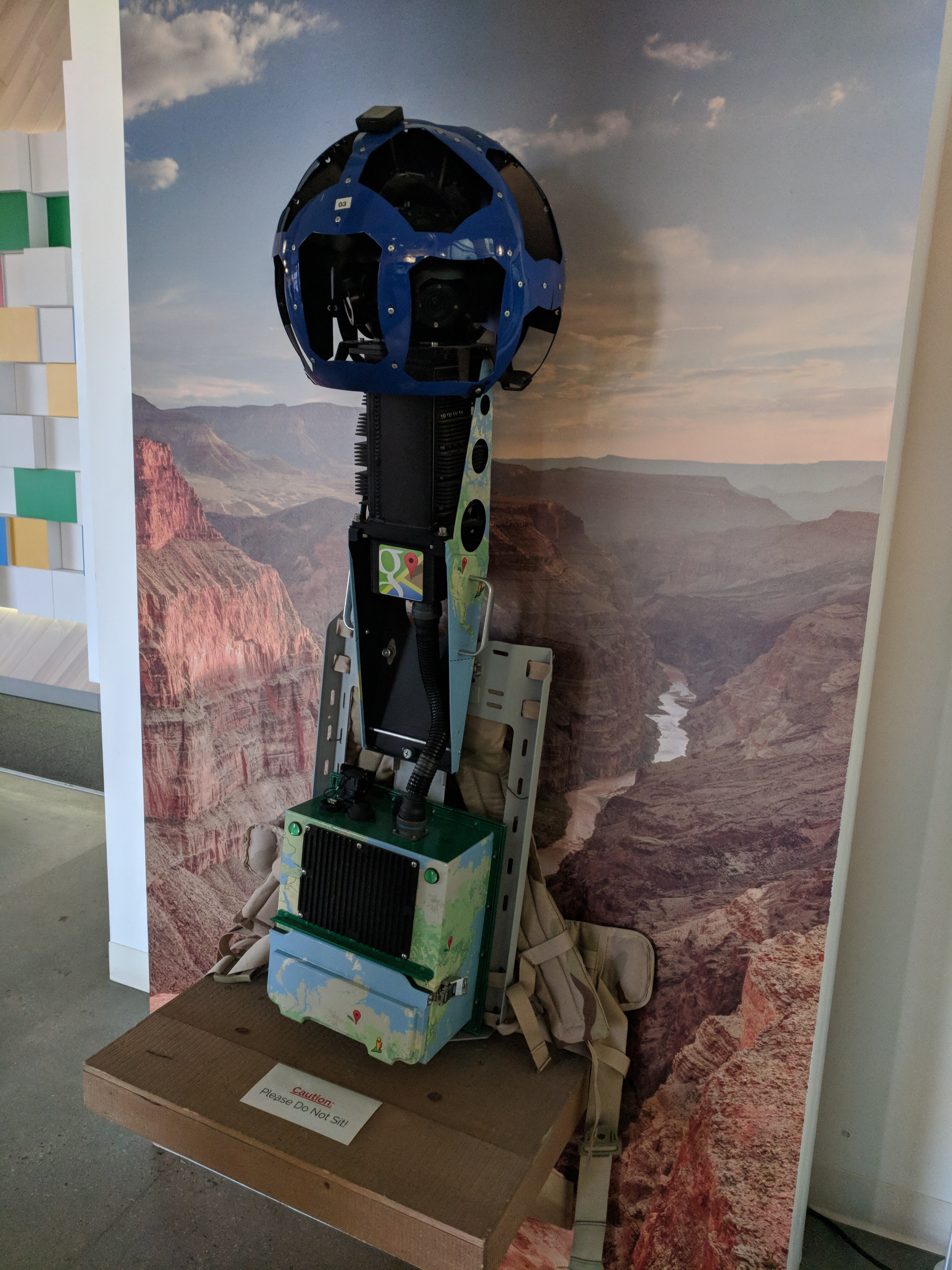
A backpack camera on display at the Google campus in Mountain View, California, in February 2018

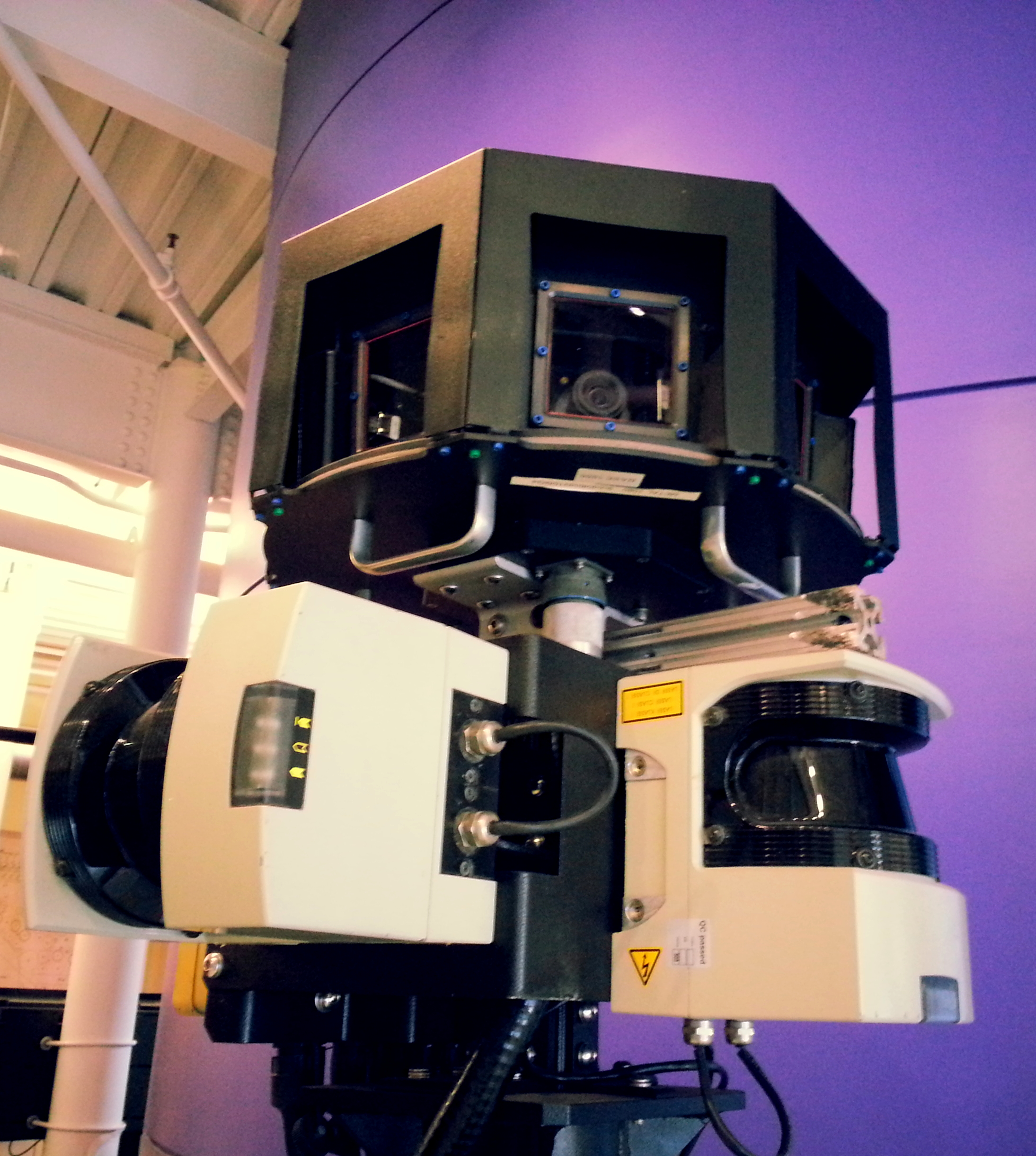
Google Street View camera mounted on a "trike" is on display at the Computer History Museum in Mountain View, California.

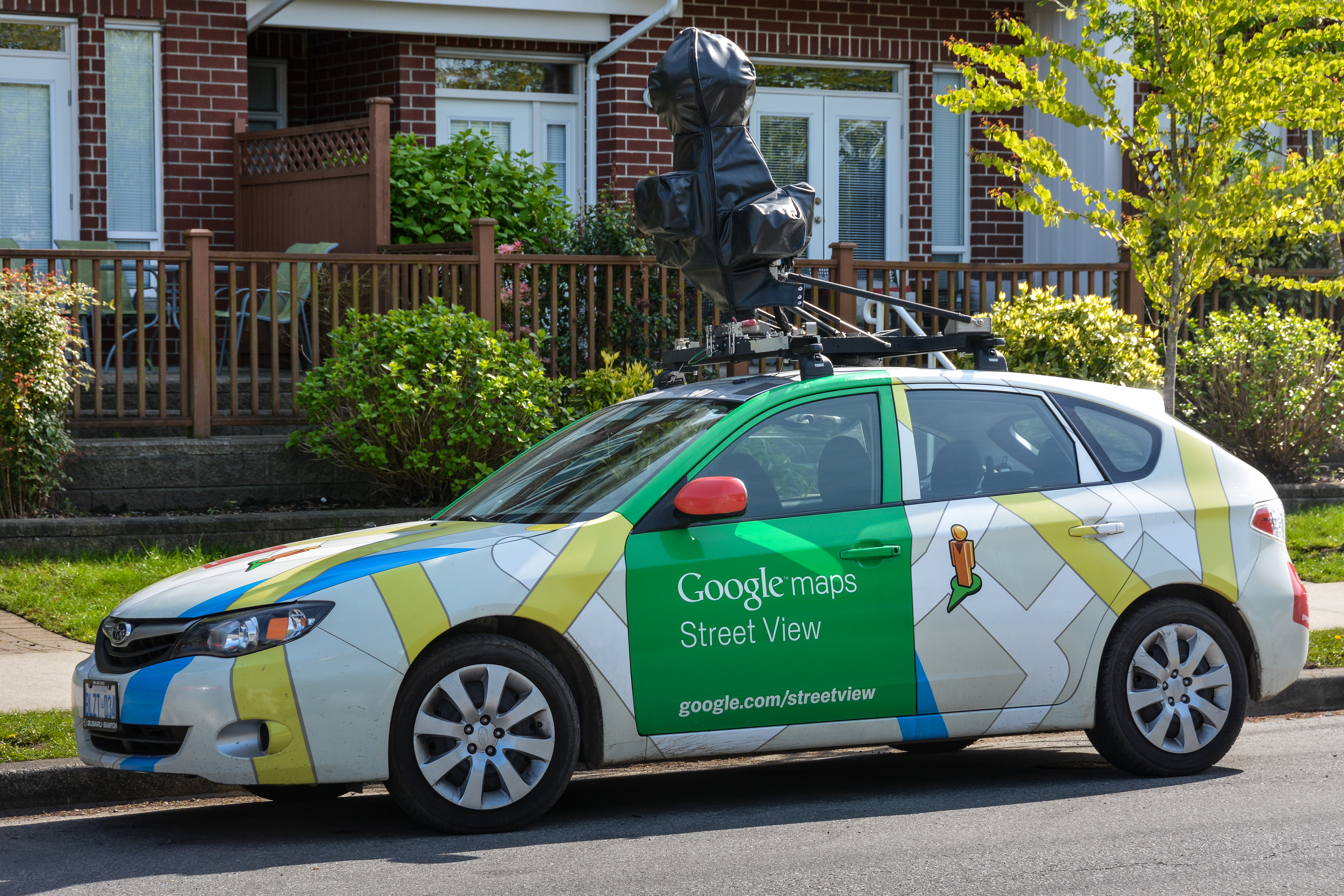
Google Maps car and camera used for collecting Street View data in Steveston, Canada

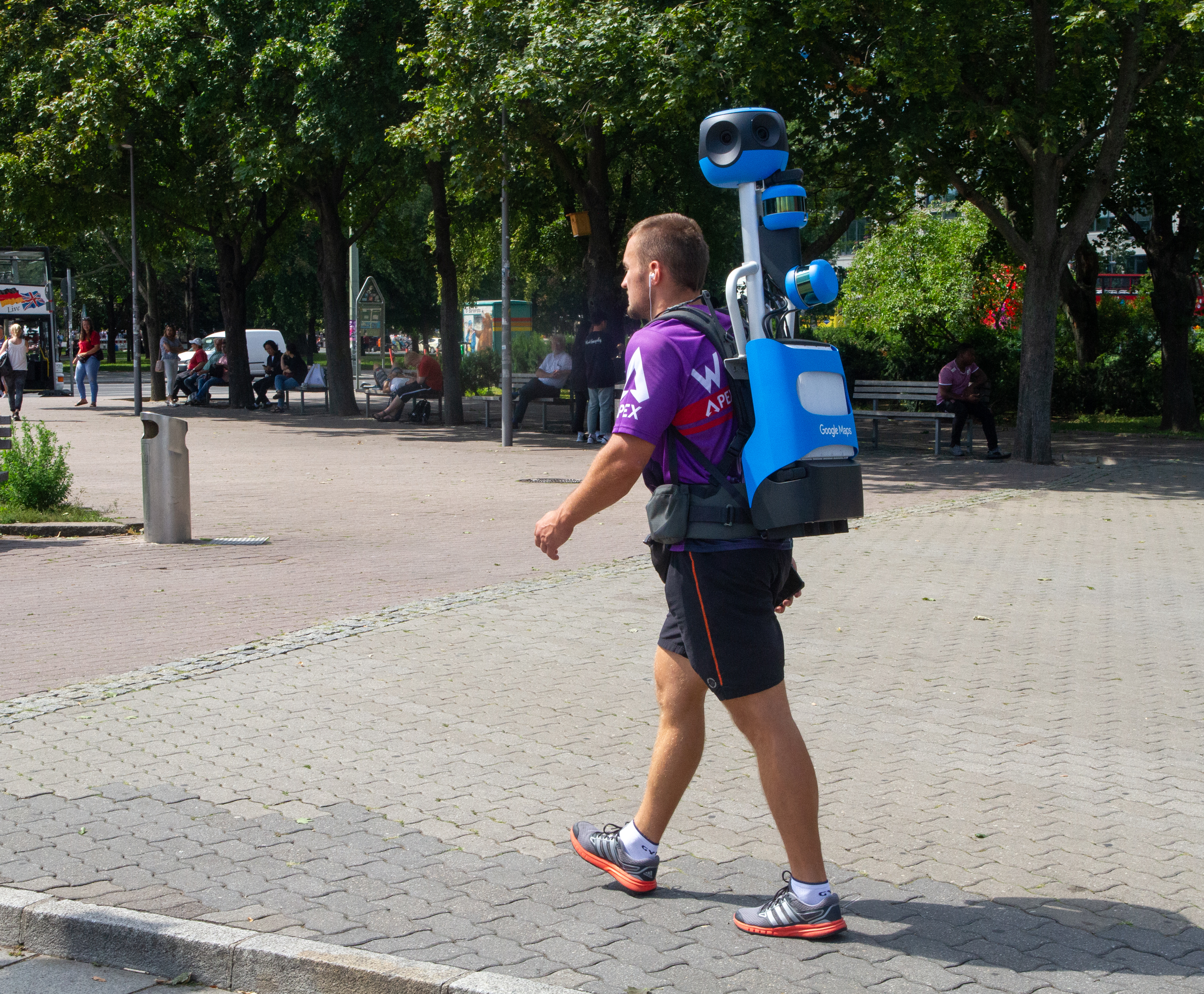
Backpack Google Street View camera in Berlin, Germany

== See also ==
- Aspen Movie Map (oldest project of this type)
- Historypin: a user-generated archive of historical photos, videos, audio recordings and personal recollections.
- List of street view services
- Look Around (Apple)
- Route inspection problem (algorithmic problem related to the planning of Street View car routes)
- VR photography
