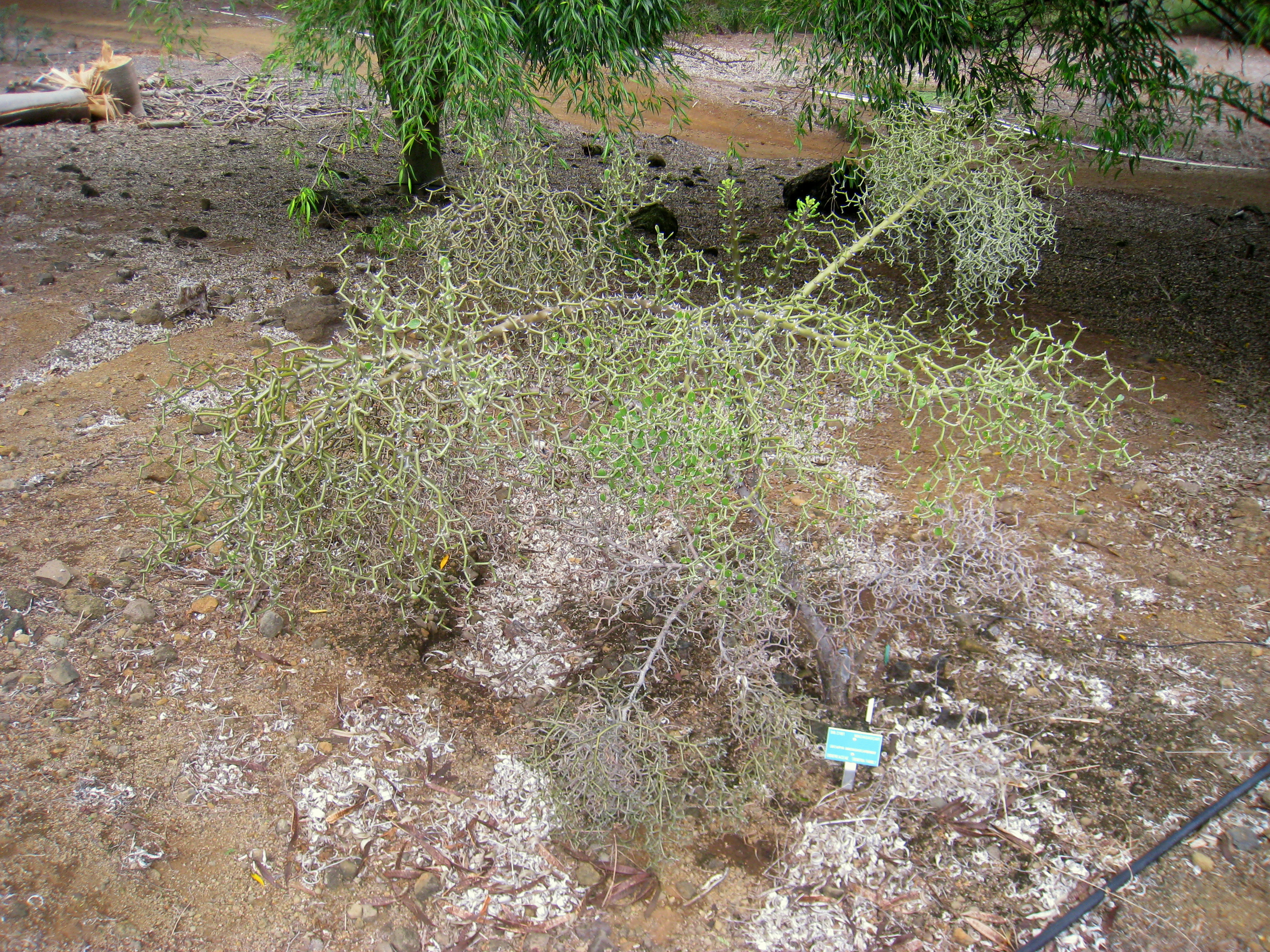

Conservation status
- Near Threatened (IUCN 3.1)

Scientific classification
- Kingdom: Plantae
- Clade: Tracheophytes
- Clade: Angiosperms
- Clade: Eudicots
- Order: Caryophyllales
- Family: Didiereaceae
- Genus: Decarya; Choux (1929)
- Species: D. madagascariensis

Binomial name
- Decarya madagascariensis Choux (1934)

Synonyms
- Alluaudia geayi Choux (1929), nom. nud.

= Decarya =

Genus of plants

Decarya is a monotypic genus of flowering plants belonging to the family Didiereaceae. It has one species, Decarya madagascariensis, a shrub or tree endemic to southern Madagascar. It grows up to 6 meters in height, with zig-zagging branches covered in short spines.

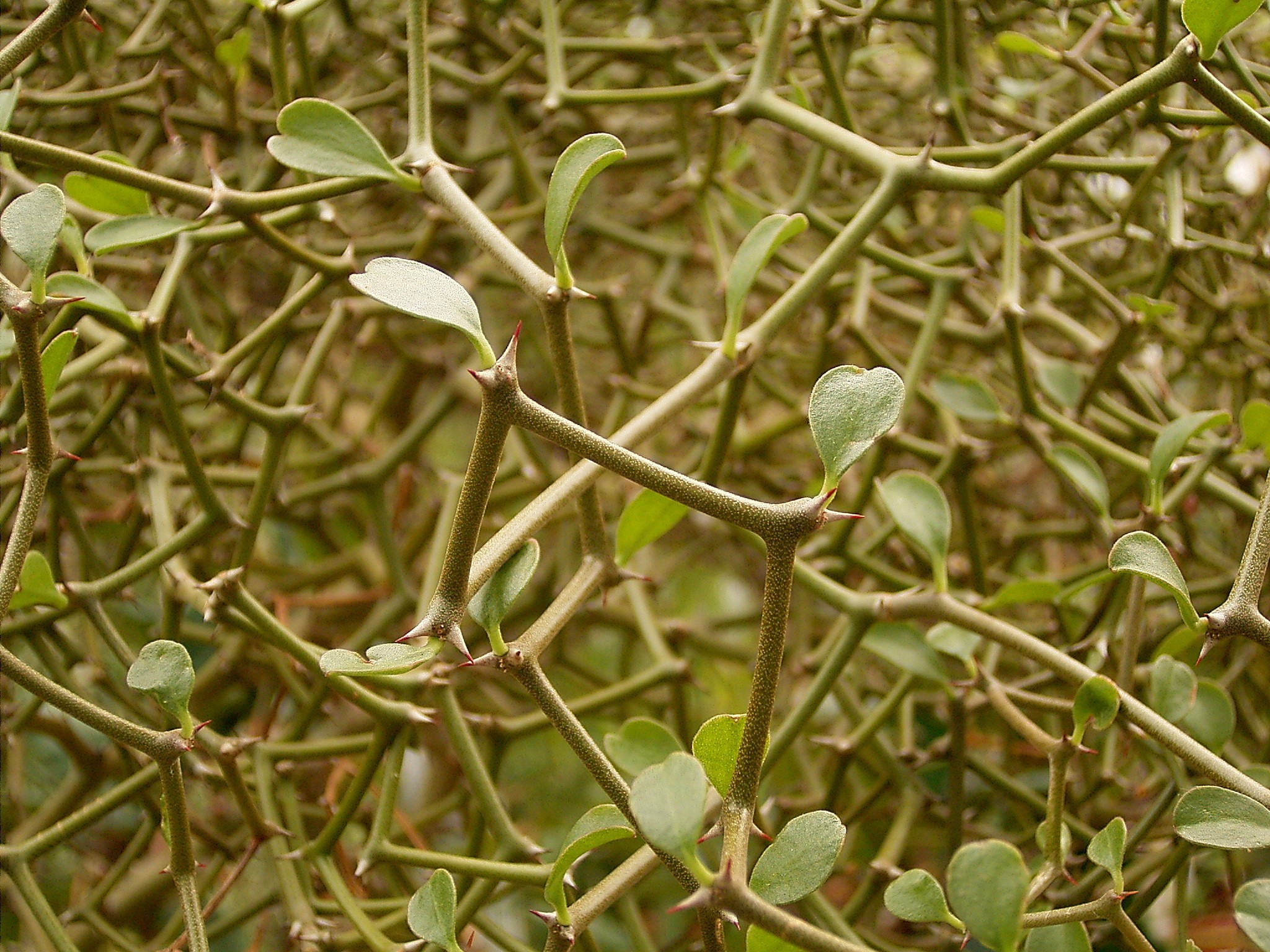

It is native to Atsimo-Andrefana, Androy, and Anosy regions of southern Madagascar, where it is found between Toliara and Tolagnaro. It grows in dry spiny thicket or forest and in degraded thicket on limestone, from sea level to 400 meters elevation. It often grows with species of Didierea and Euphorbia. The plant is threatened by habitat destruction from human-caused fires, land clearance for agriculture and pasture, and over-harvesting for charcoal production, and its population is thought to be declining. The IUCN Red List assesses the species as near-threatened.

The species was first described and published in Mém. Acad. Natl. Sci. Lyon, Cl. Sci. Vol.17 page 62 in 1934. The genus is named after Raymond Decary (1891–1973), French botanist, ethnologist and colonial administrator who conducted research in Madagascar and collected for the National Museum of Natural History, France.

== Gallery ==
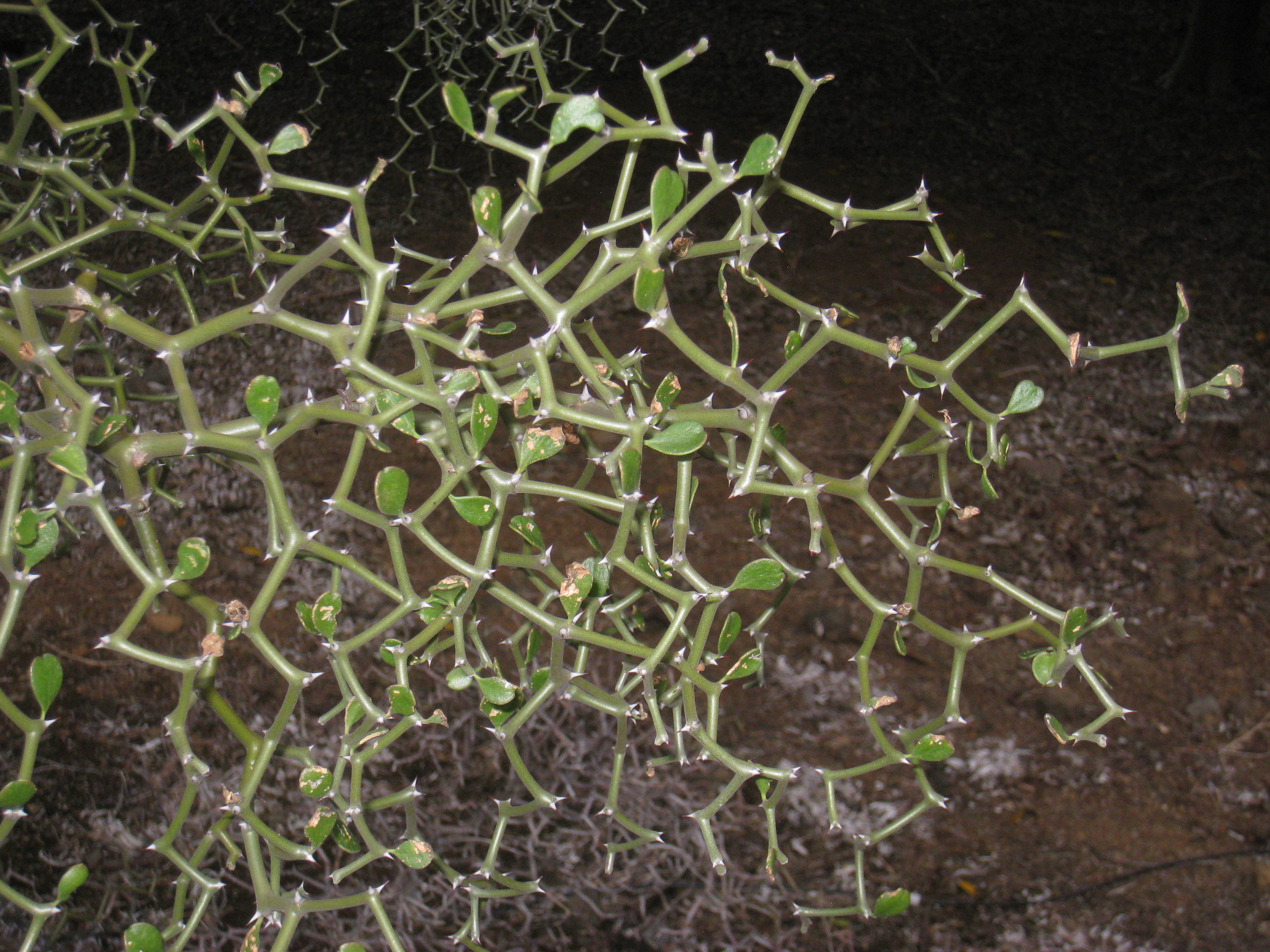

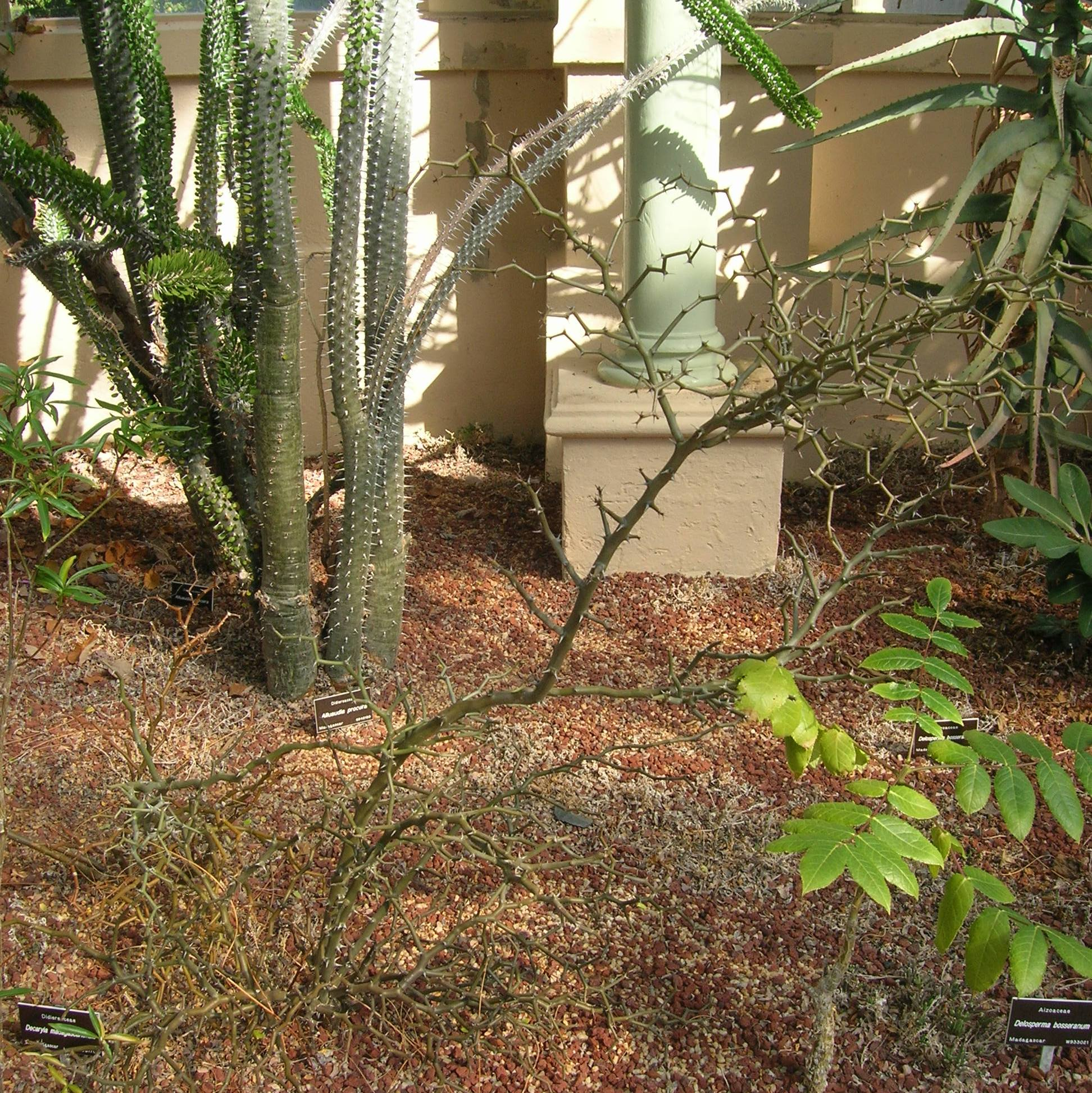
Decarya with Alluaudia procera and Delosperma bosseranum

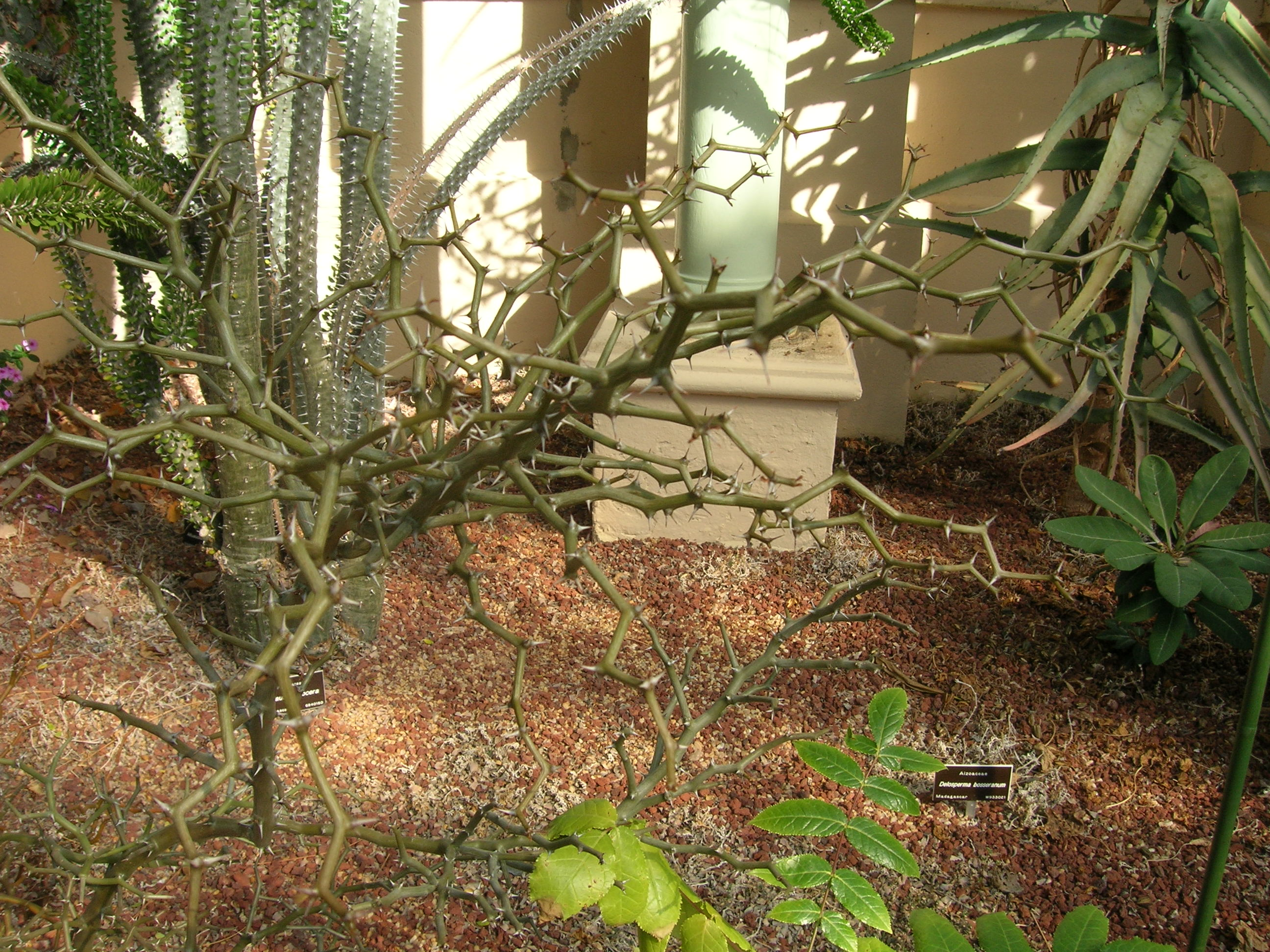

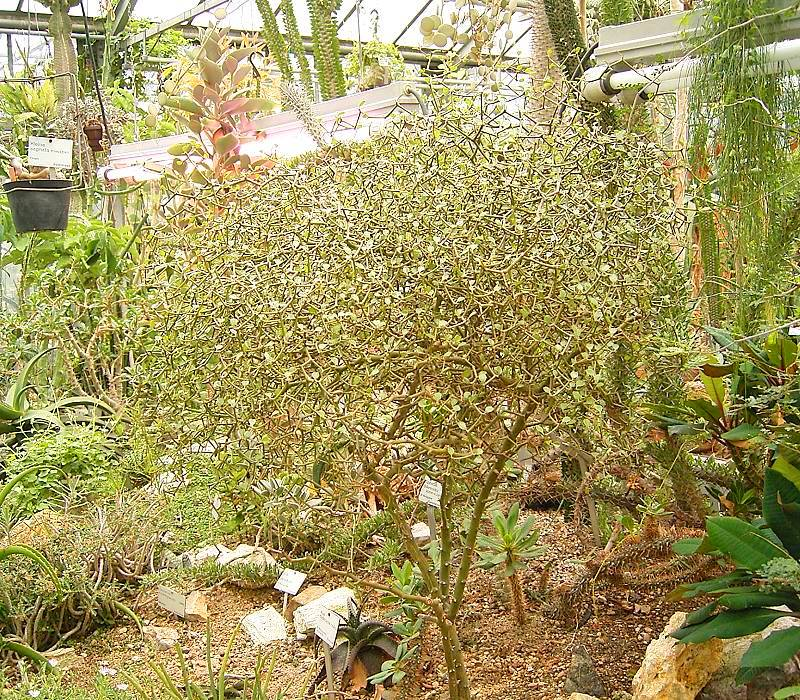

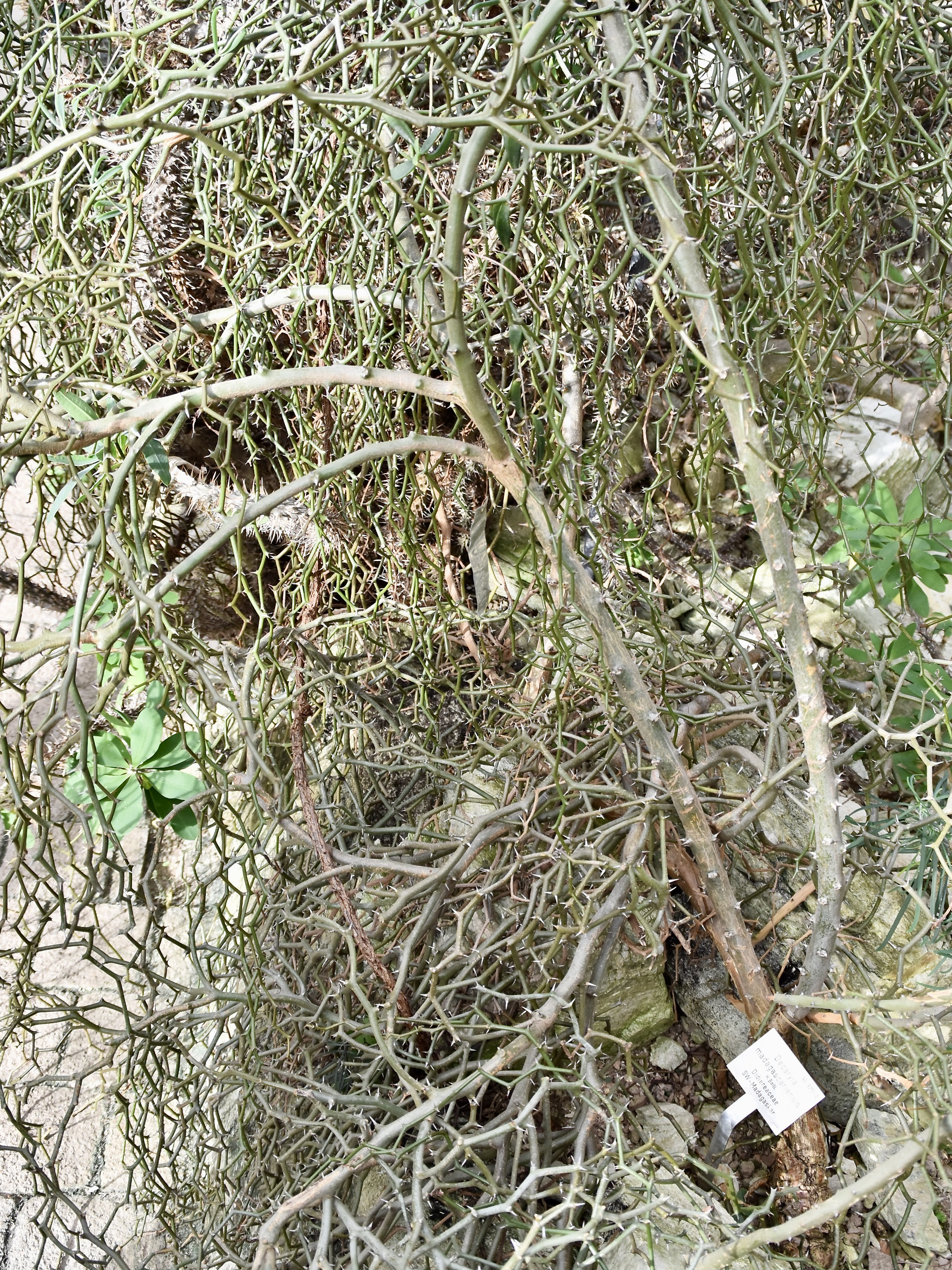
