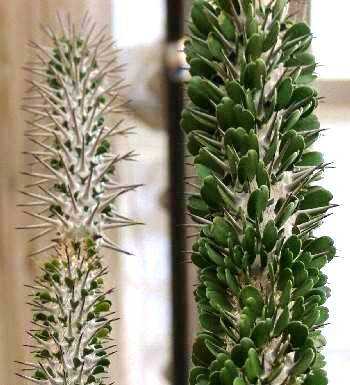
- Alluaudia montagnacii

Scientific classification
- Kingdom: Plantae
- Clade: Tracheophytes
- Clade: Angiosperms
- Clade: Eudicots
- Order: Caryophyllales
- Suborder: Portulacineae
- Family: Didiereaceae; Radlk.

Subfamilies
- Calyptrothecoideae; Didiereoideae; Portulacarioideae

= Didiereaceae =

Family of flowering plants

Didiereaceae is a family of flowering plants found in continental Africa and Madagascar. It contains 20 species classified in three subfamilies and six genera. Species of the family are succulent plants, growing in sub-arid to arid habitats. Several are known as ornamental plants in specialist succulent collections. The subfamily Didiereoideae is endemic to the southwest of Madagascar, where the species are characteristic elements of the spiny thickets.

== Systematics ==
The family was long considered entirely endemic to Madagascar until the genera Calyptrotheca, Ceraria, and Portulacaria from the African mainland were included. Molecular phylogenetic analysis confirmed the monophyly of the family and its three subfamilies:

- Didiereaceae
  - Portulacarioideae
    Portulacaria
  - - Calyptrothecoideae
      Calyptrotheca
    - Didiereoideae
      - Alluaudiopsis
      - - Alluaudia
        - - Decarya
          - Didierea

The family is closely related to the New World family Cactaceae (cacti), sufficiently closely so that species of Didiereaceae can be grafted successfully on some cacti.

== Calyptrothecoideae ==
Contains only one genus, Calyptrotheca, with two species found in tropical East Africa.

== Didiereoideae ==
This subfamily is endemic to Madagascar, where it is found in the spiny thickets of the dry southwest. The plants are spiny succulent shrubs and trees from 2–20 m tall, with thick water-storing stems and leaves that are deciduous in the long dry season. All of the species except Alluaudiopsis have a distinct youth form. They start as small procumbent shrubs but eventually a dominant stem is produced that becomes a trunk. The trunk later branches forming a crown and the basal branches die off. All species are dioecious (Decarya female-dioecious). The plants have different long-shoots and short-shoots (brachyblasts). Long-shoot leaves are soon deciduous, but brachyblasts form in the leaf axils and from them grow small leaves that appear singly or in pairs and are accompanied by conical spines (much like the areoles found in cacti). The flowers are unisexual (except from Decarya) and radially symmetric, made up of four tepals with two basal bracts. Flowers rarely occur singly. They usually develop in branched clusters that emerge instead of leaves from the brachyblasts.

There are four genera with eleven species:

Alluaudia (Drake) Drake 1903

- Alluaudia ascendens (Drake) Drake 1903
- Alluaudia comosa (Drake) Drake 1903
- Alluaudia dumosa (Drake) Drake 1903
- Alluaudia humbertii Choux 1934
- Alluaudia montagnacii Rauh 1961 – probably a natural hybrid of A. ascendens and A. procera
- Alluaudia procera (Drake) Drake 1903 – quite easy grown and the most frequent species in cultivation

Alluaudiopsis Humbert & Choux 1934

- Alluaudiopsis fiherenensis Humbert & Choux 1934
- Alluaudiopsis marnieriana Rauh 1961

Decarya Choux 1929

- Decarya madagascariensis Choux 1929

Didierea Baillon 1880

- Didierea madagascariensis Baillon 1880
- Didierea trollii Capuron & Rauh 1961

Key to the genera of Didieroideae:

1	Spines in groups of four or more:	Didierea
-	Spines single or in pairs:	→ 2
2	Shoots striking zigzagged, spines short conical:	Decarya
-	Shoots not zigzagged, spines long conical to needle-like:	→ 3
3	Shrubs strongly branched, leaves lanceolate:	Alluaudiopsis
-	Shrubs little branched, leaves either ovate to circular or scale-like and awl-shaped:	Alluaudia

== Portulacarioideae ==
Contains one genus, Portulacaria, with seven species, distributed in Southern Africa. Species formerly considered in the separate genus Ceraria are now included in Portulacaria.

== Gallery ==
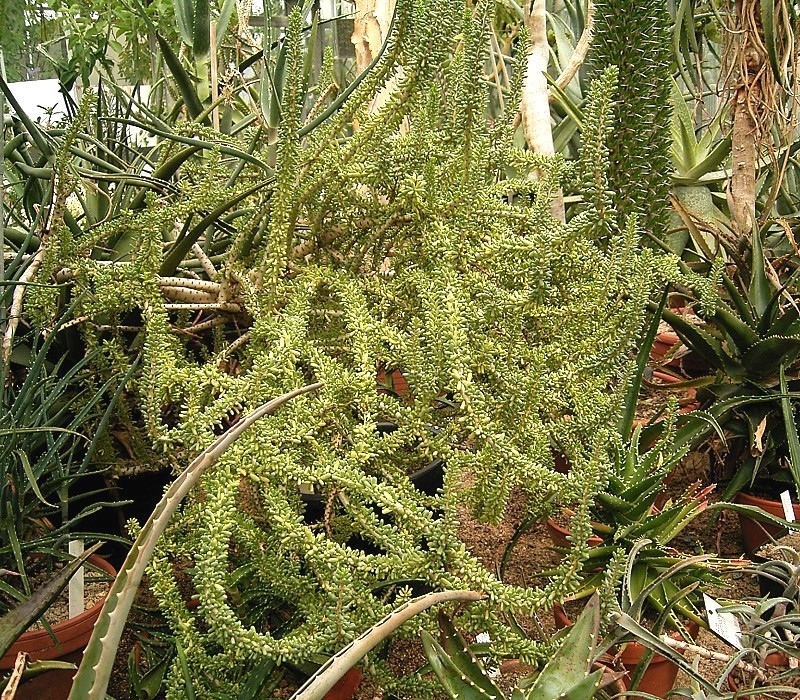
Portulacaria namaquensis

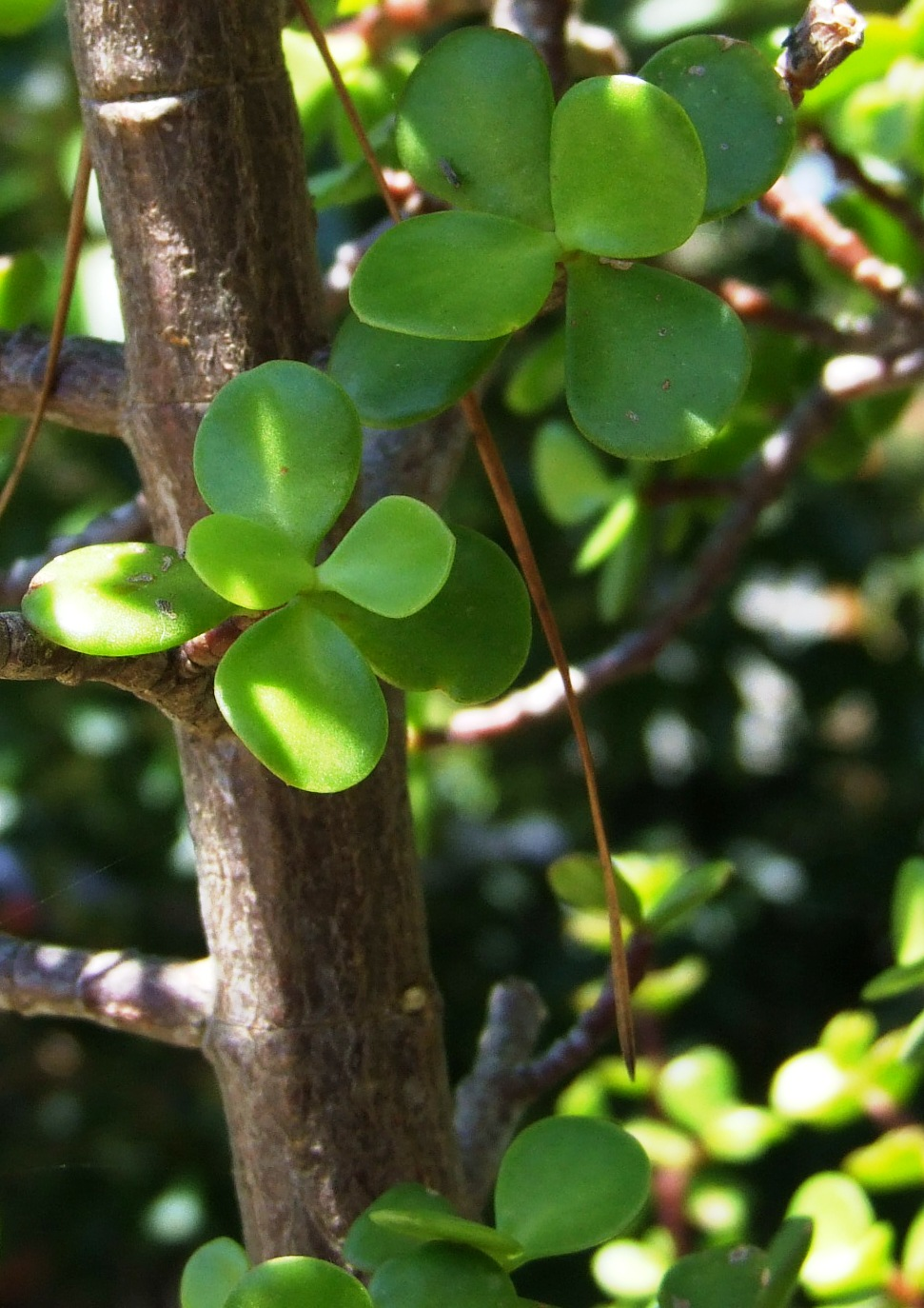
Portulacaria afra

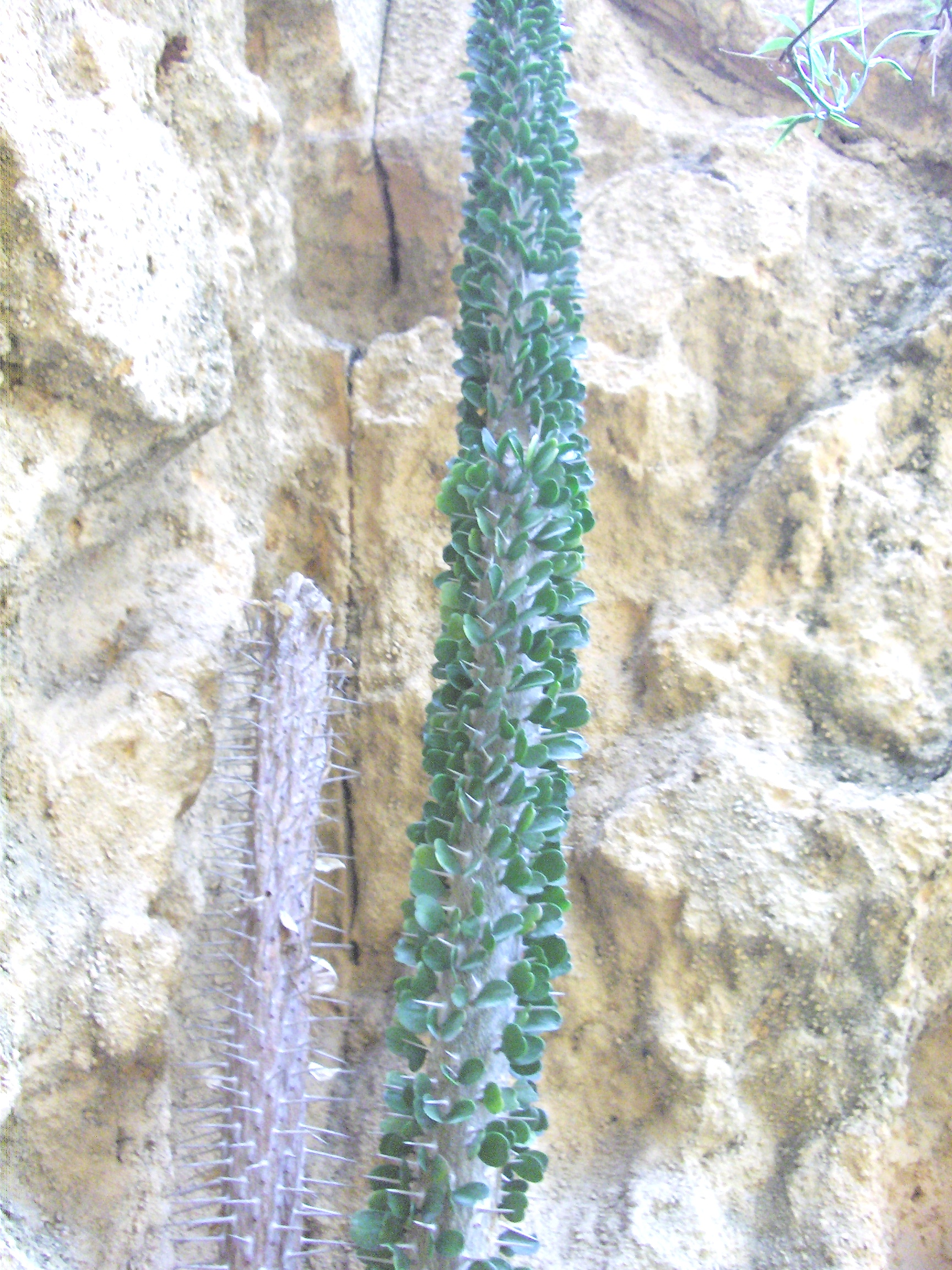
Alluaudia ascendens

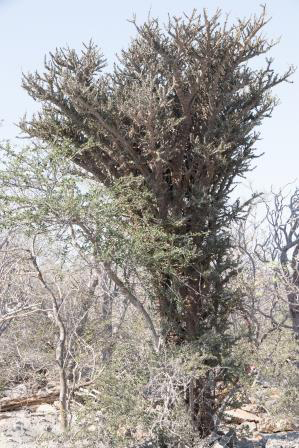
Alluaudia comosa

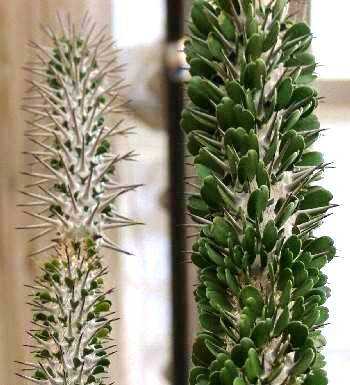
Alluaudia montagnacii

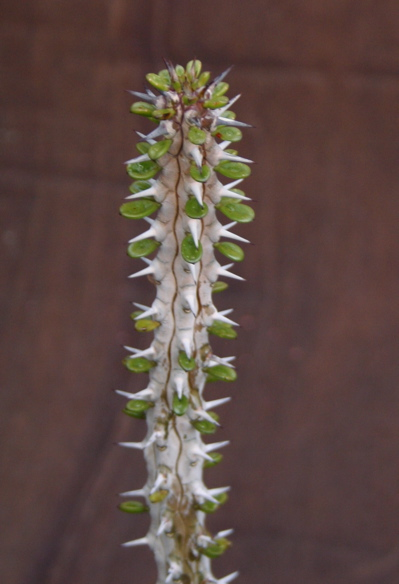
Alluaudia procera
