= Jalantzia lokohensis =

Scientific classification
- Kingdom: Plantae
- Clade: Tracheophytes
- Clade: Angiosperms
- Clade: Eudicots
- Clade: Asterids
- Order: Asterales
- Family: Asteraceae
- Genus: Jalantzia
- Species: J. lokohensis

Binomial name
- Jalantzia lokohensis (Humbert) D.J.N. Hind

Synonyms
- Vernoniopsis caudata subsp. lokohensis Humbert; Vernoniopsis lokohensis (Humbert) Callm. & Phillipson

Species of plant

Jalantzia lokohensis is a species of flowering plant in the family Asteraceae, native to Madagascar.

== Taxonomy ==
The species was first described by Jean-Henri Humbert in 1955 as Vernoniopsis caudata subsp. lokohensis. It was raised to a full species in 2011 as Vernoniopsis lokohensis. However, Humbert's genus name Vernoniopsis, is illegitimate, as it is a later homonym. In 2024, the replacement name Jalantzia was published for Vernoniopsis Humbert, and this species became Jalantzia lokohensis. As of May 2024, Plants of the World Online still treated it as Vernoniopsis lokohensis.
