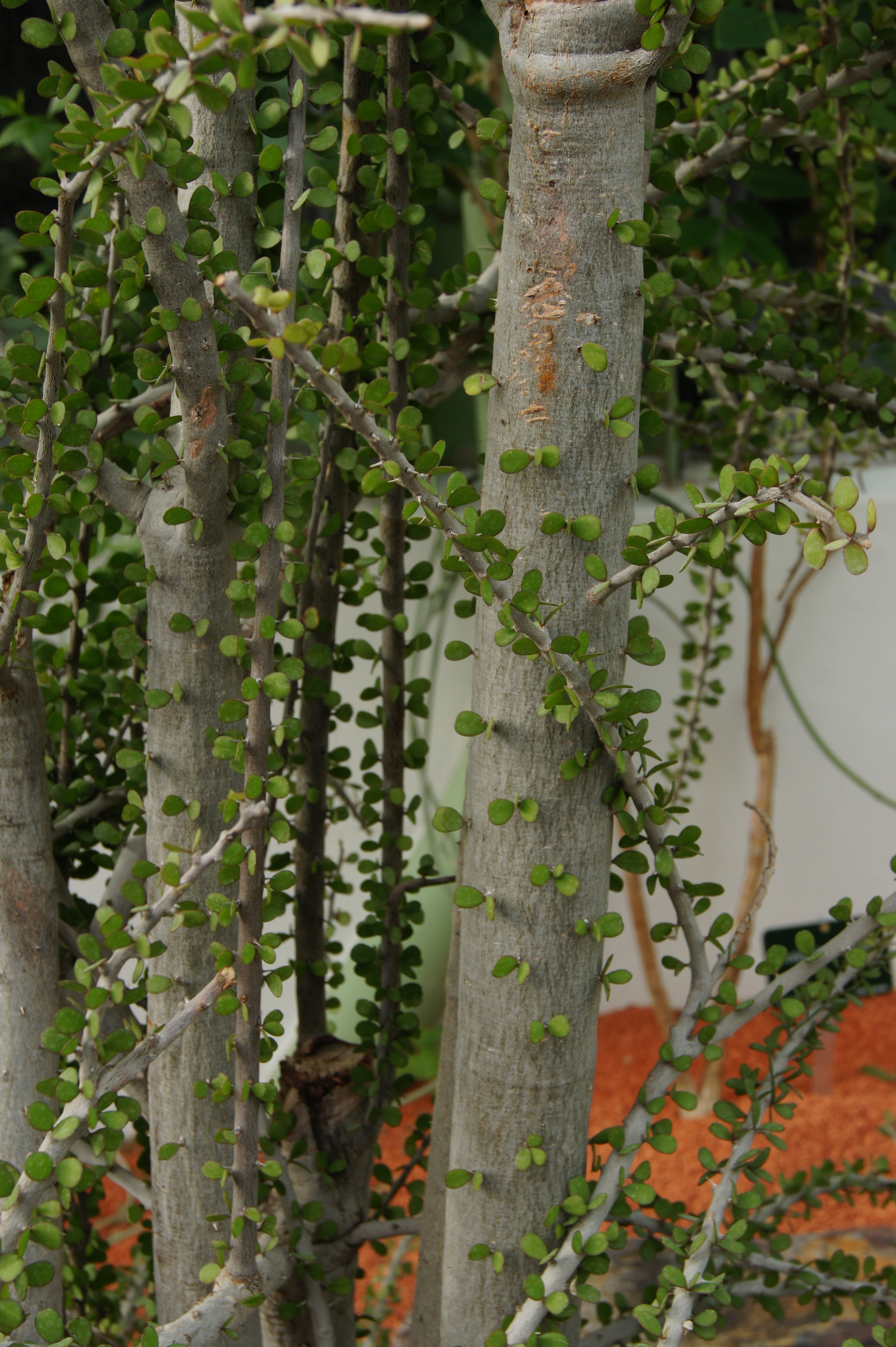
- Alluaudia humbertii with Alluaudia procera

Scientific classification
- Kingdom: Plantae
- Clade: Tracheophytes
- Clade: Angiosperms
- Clade: Eudicots
- Order: Caryophyllales
- Family: Didiereaceae
- Genus: Alluaudia
- Species: A. humbertii

Binomial name
- Alluaudia humbertii Choux, 1934

= Alluaudia humbertii =

Species of flowering plant

Alluaudia humbertii is a deciduous succulent flowering shrub and species of Alluaudia native to Madagascar. It is found in the semi-arid shrublands and deserts on Madagascar's southern coasts.

It is named after Jean-Henri Humbert, a French botanist noted for his extensive studies of Madagascan specimens.

== Description ==
Like other Alluaudia species, Alluaudia humbertii is dioecious, which is male and female on separate plants. The shrub grows to 16–20 feet (4.9–6.1 m) tall when mature, with thin branches with grey bark and covered in short 0.75 inches (1.9 cm) spines. It has leaves that are succulent and oval reaching up to 0.5 mm. Its flowers are unisexual, reaching up to 1cm (10mm) in diameter and usually is pale green in color. Its fruits are small, dry, and capsule-like fruit that are oblong to globular, containing at least several seeds.

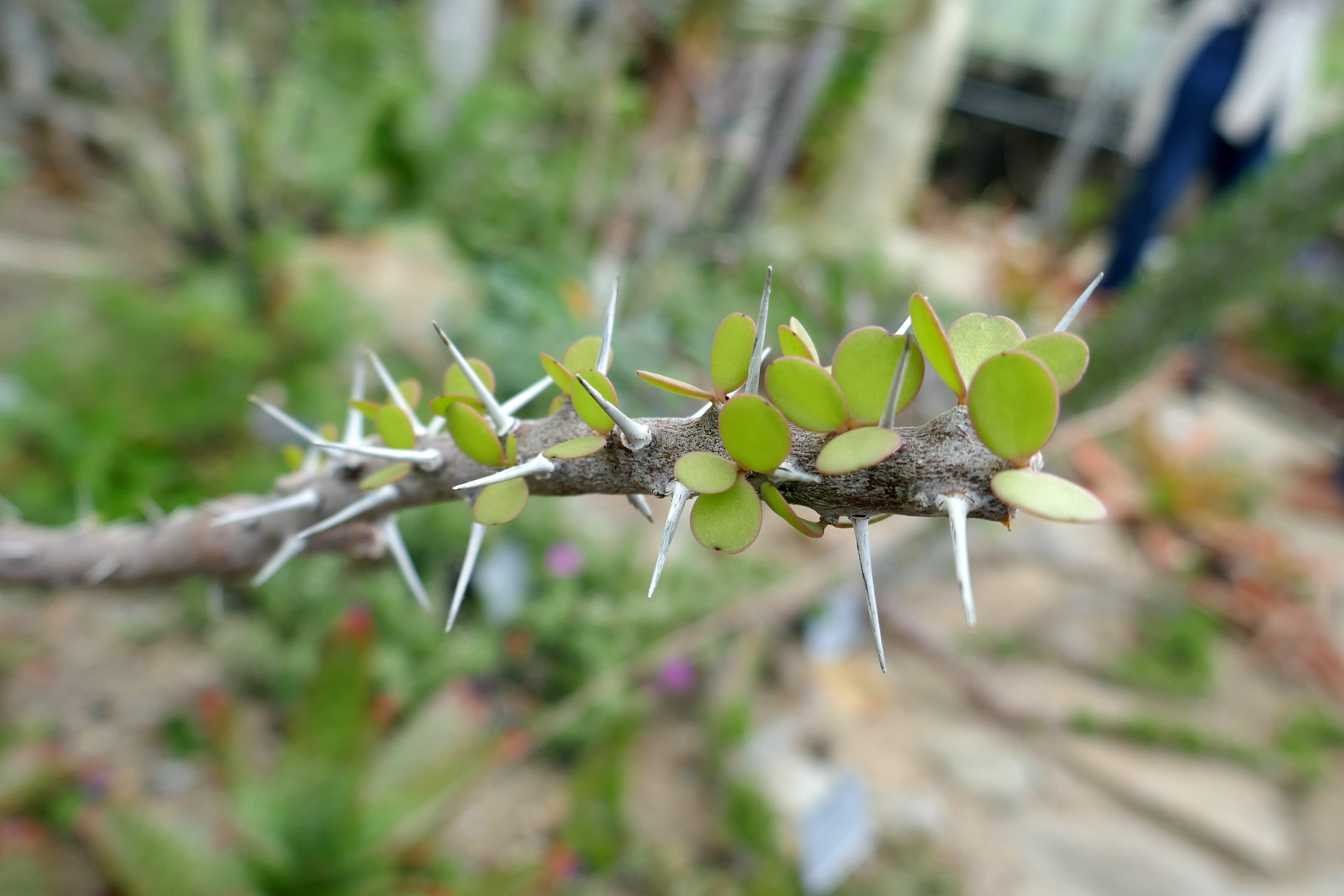

== Distribution and habitat ==
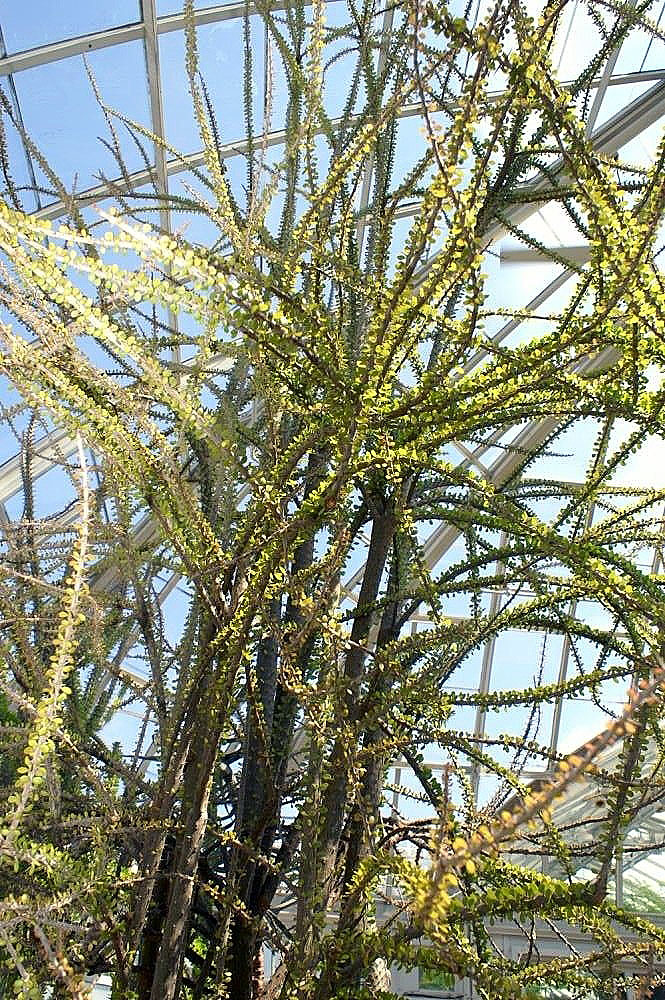

== Gallery ==
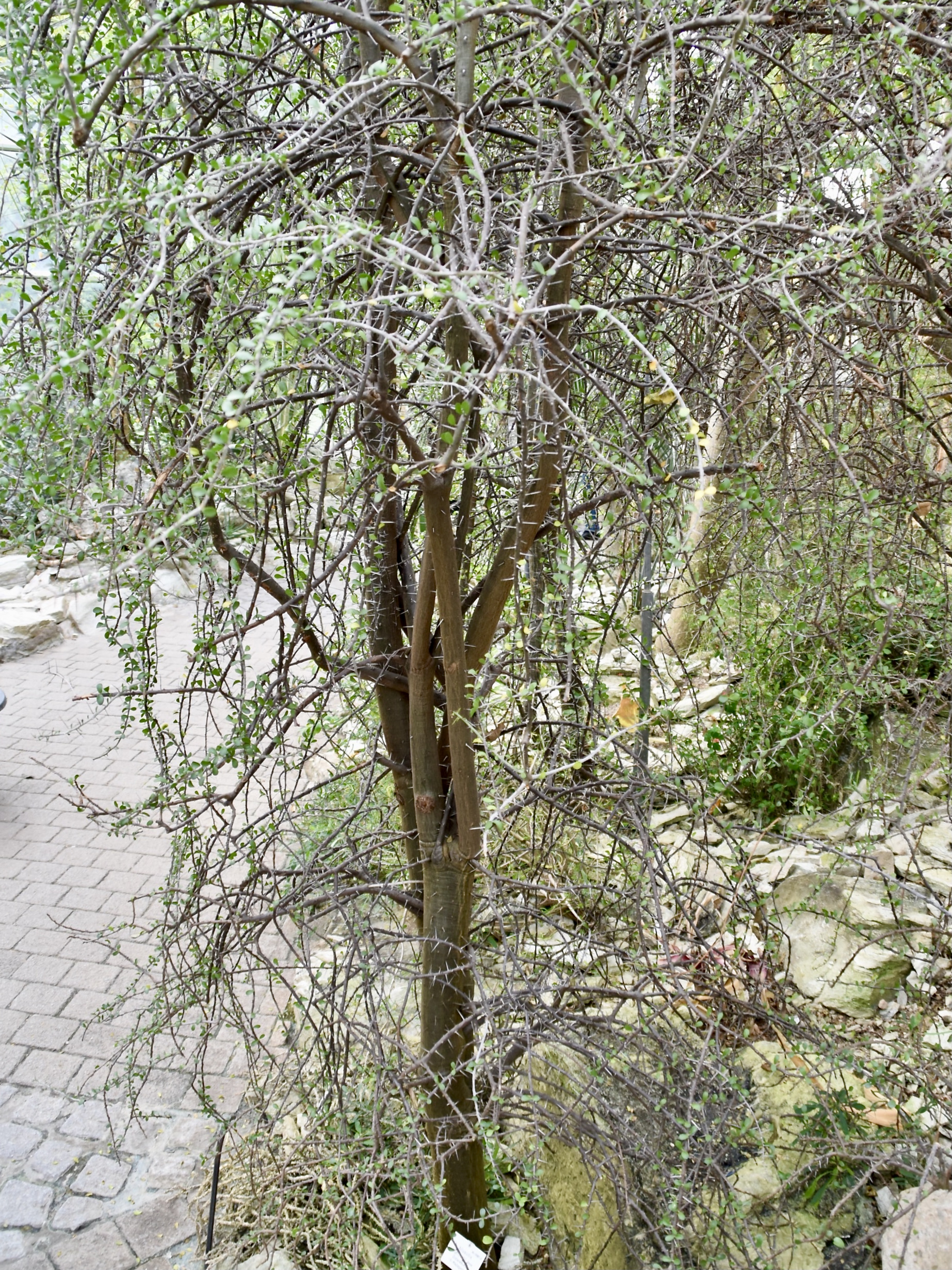

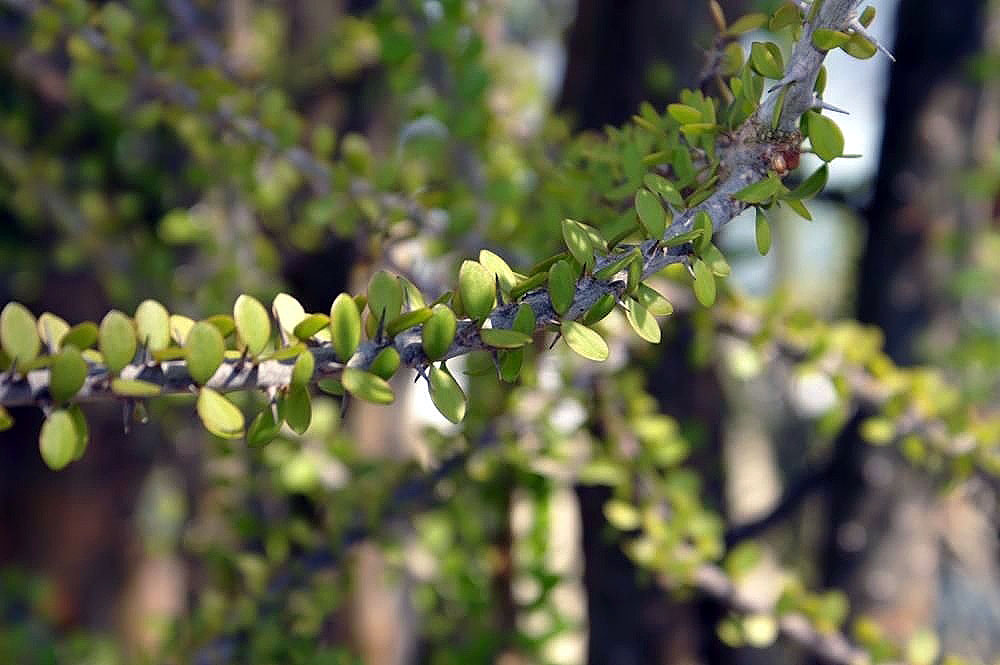

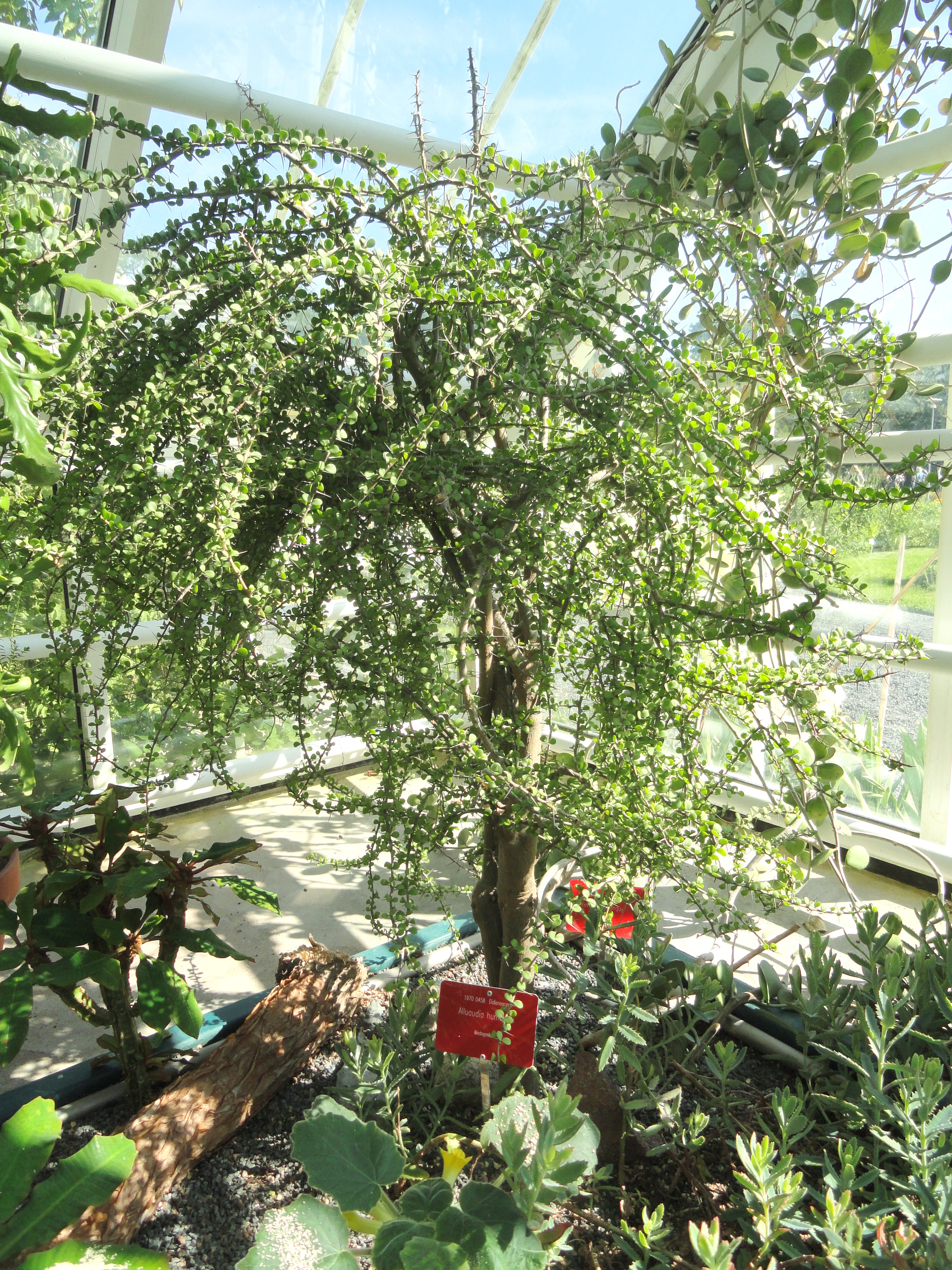

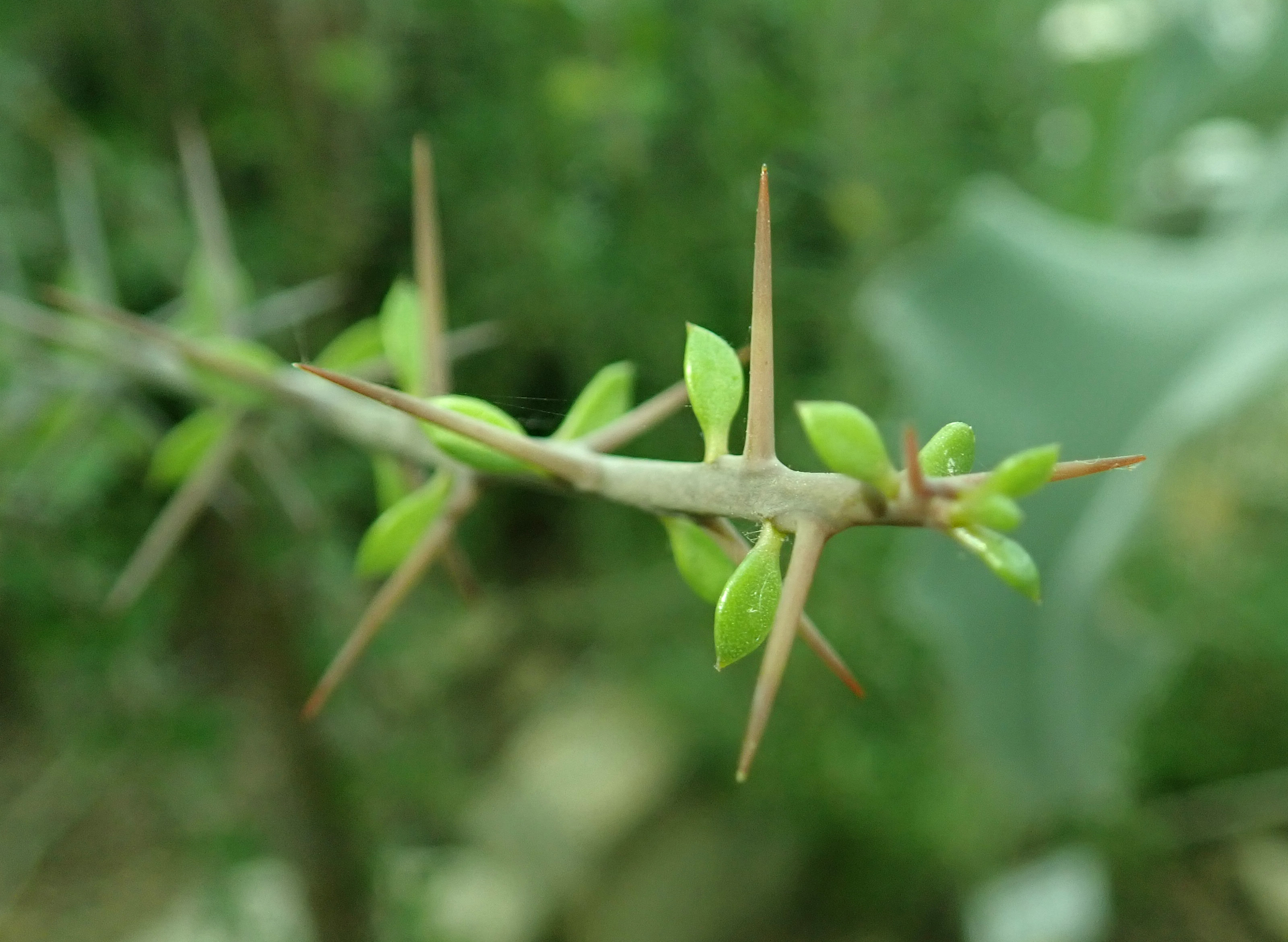

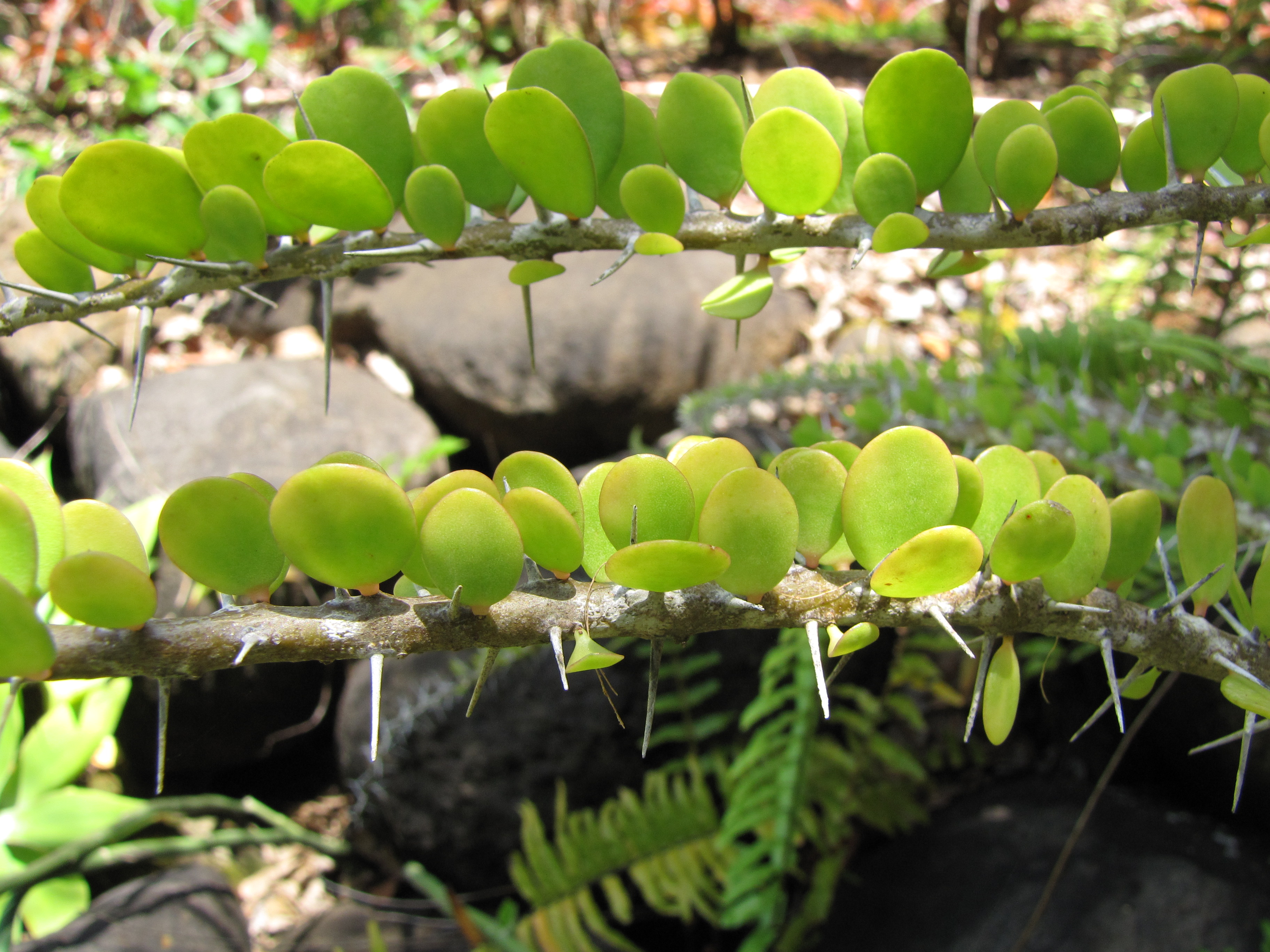

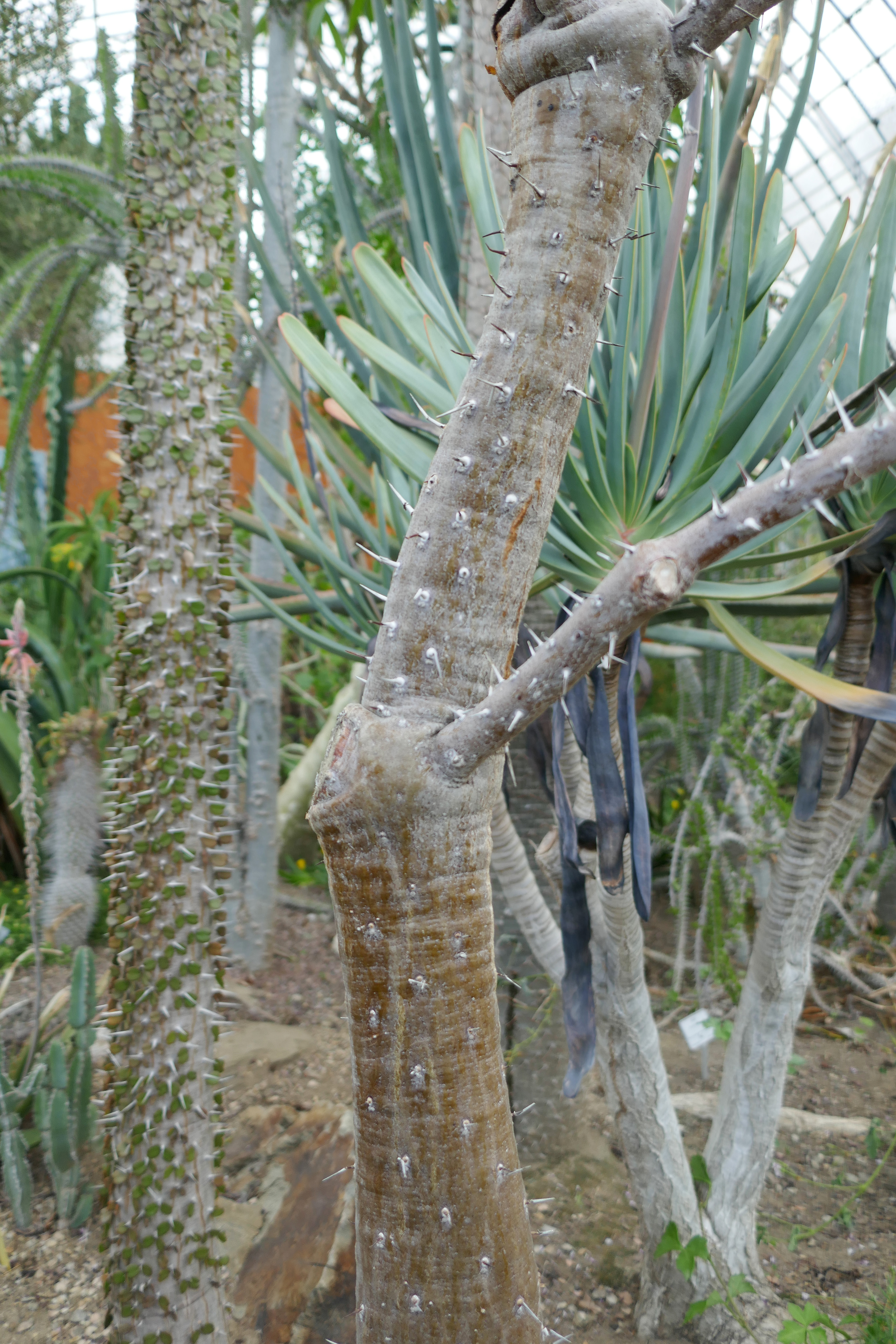

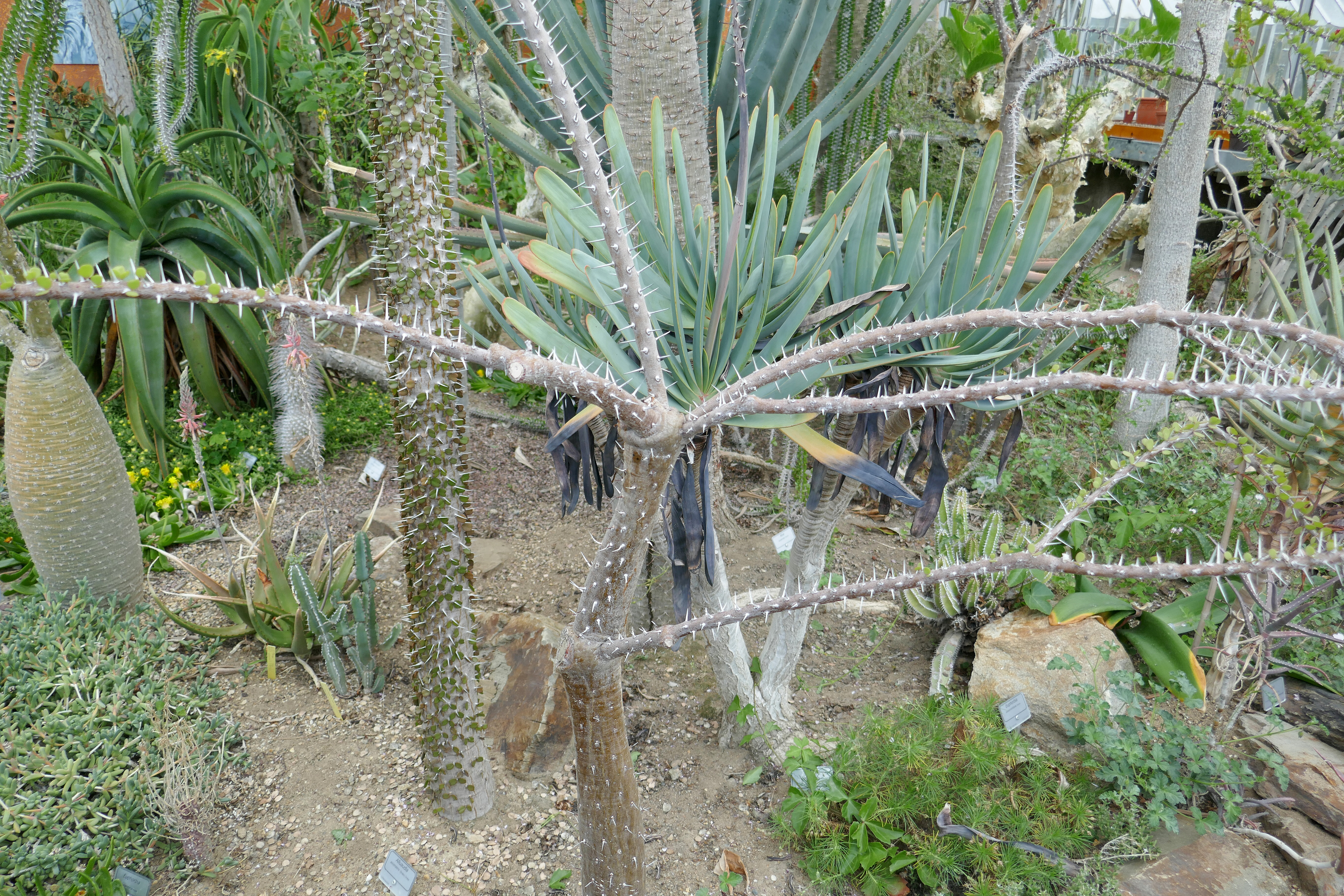

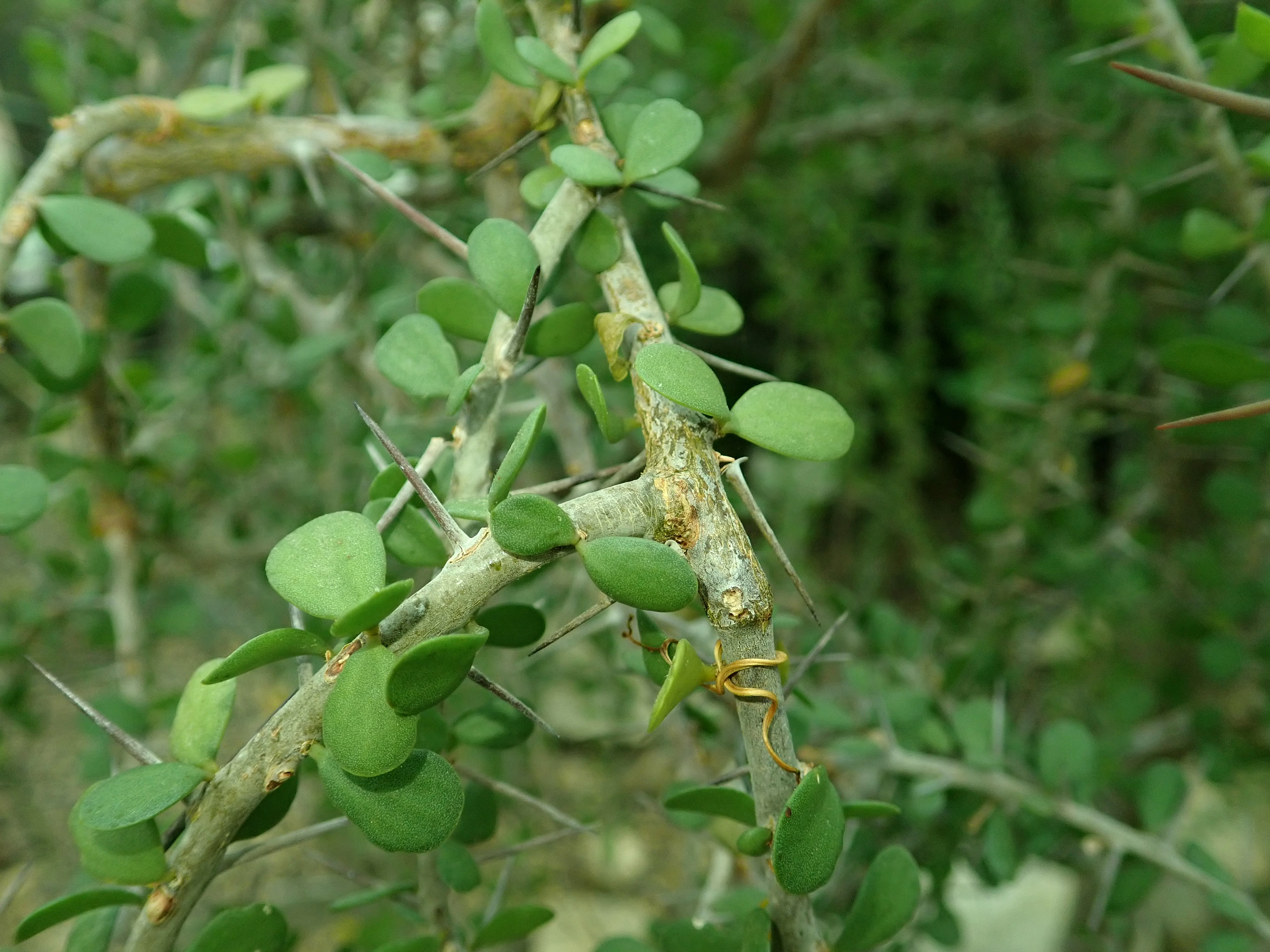

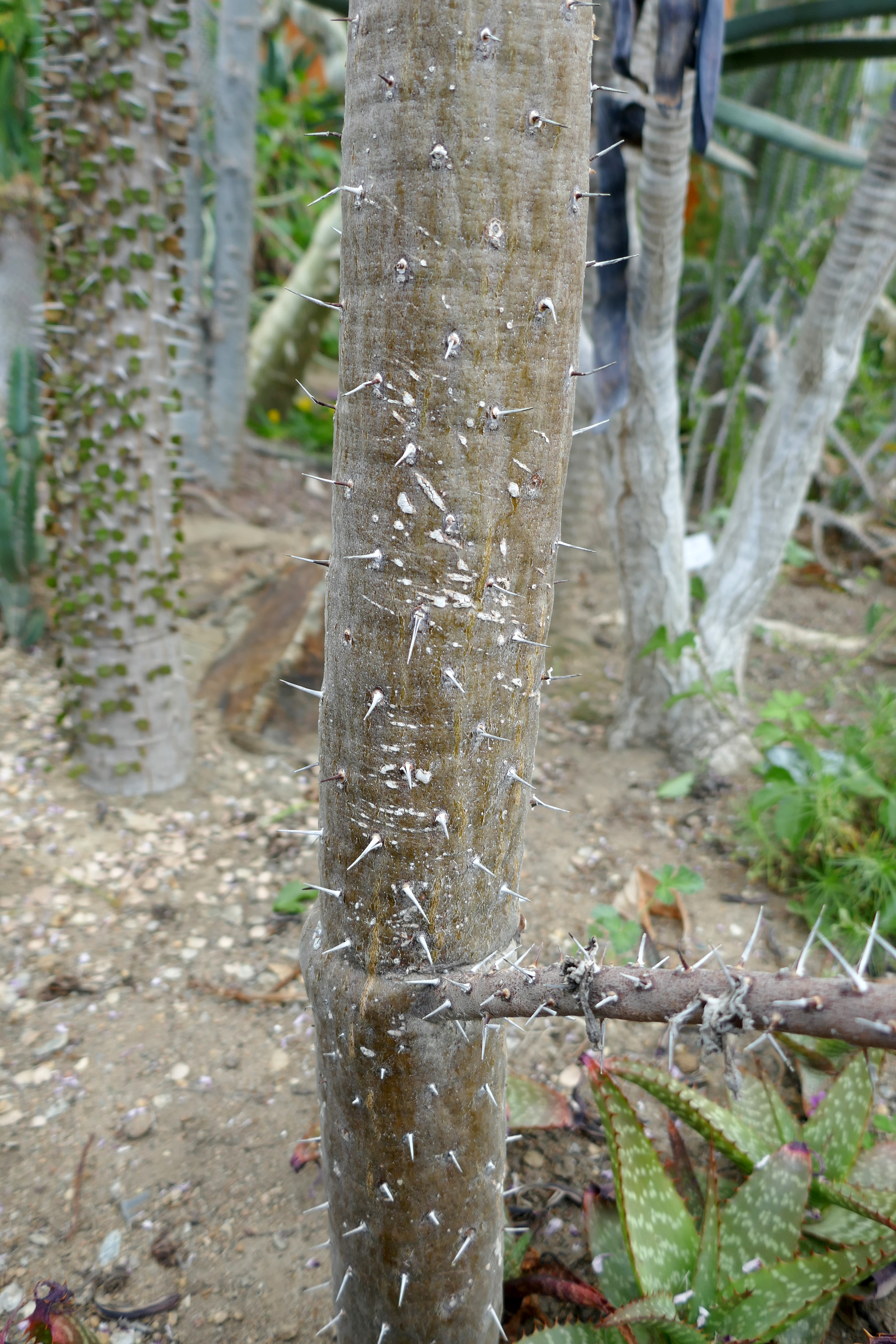

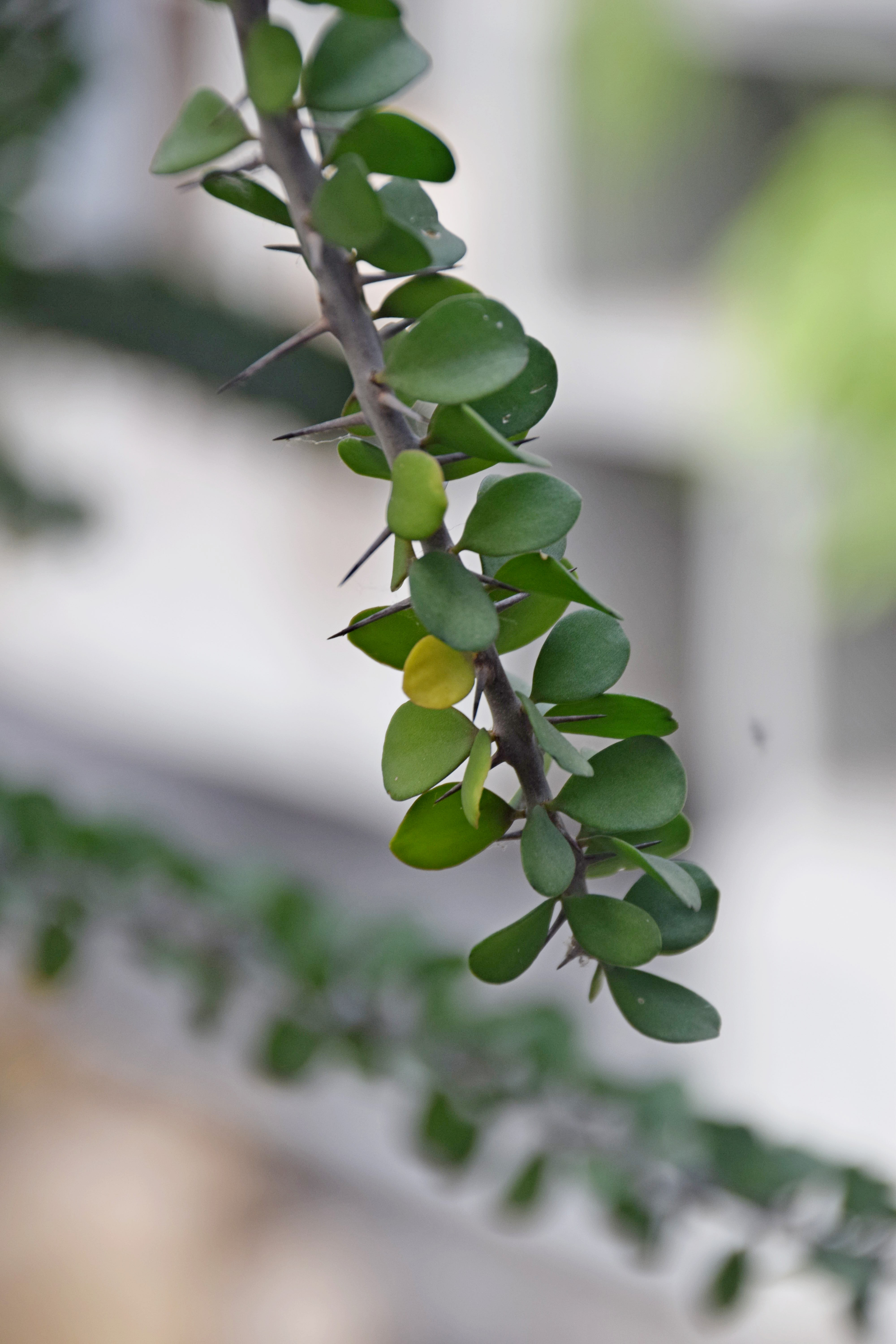

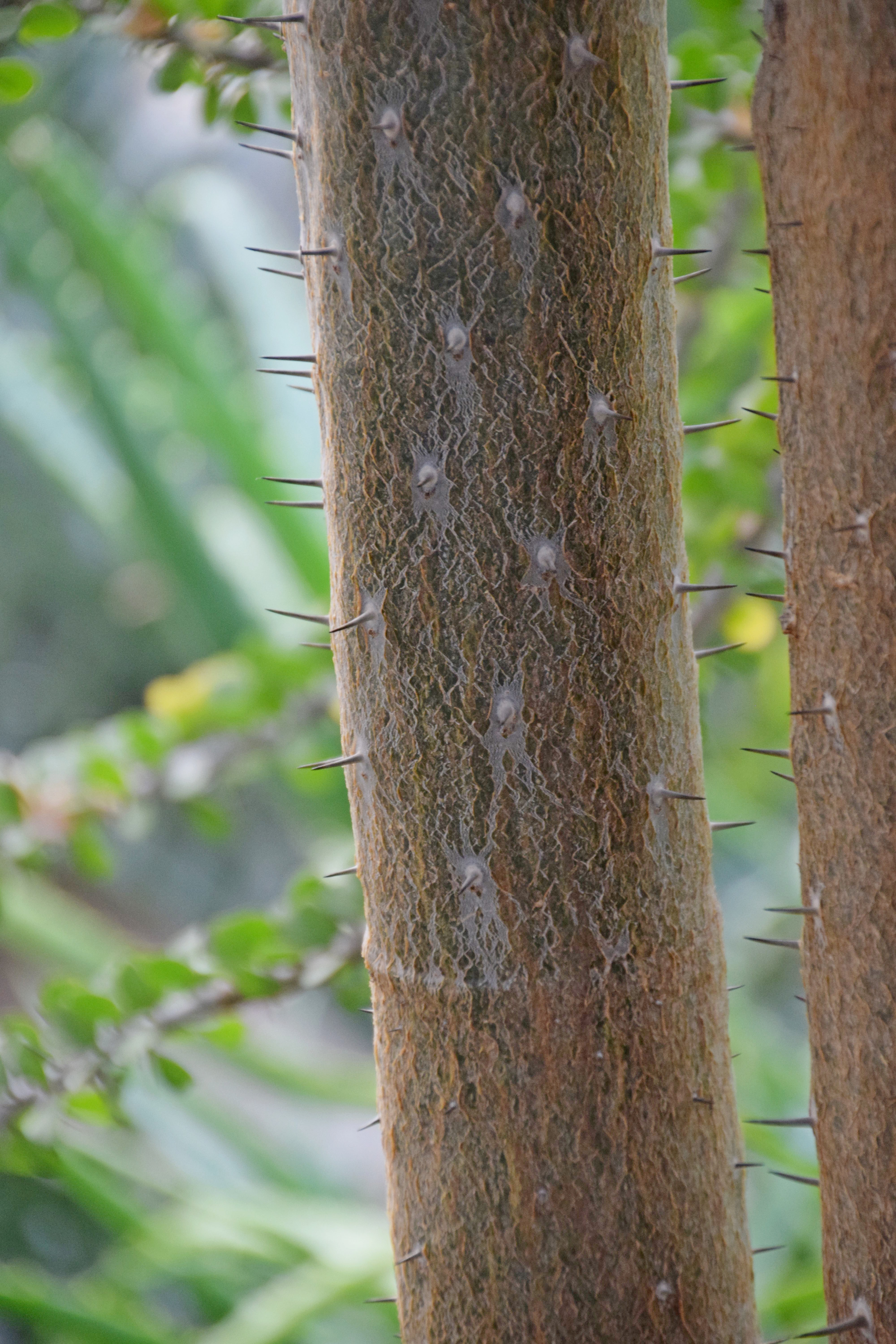

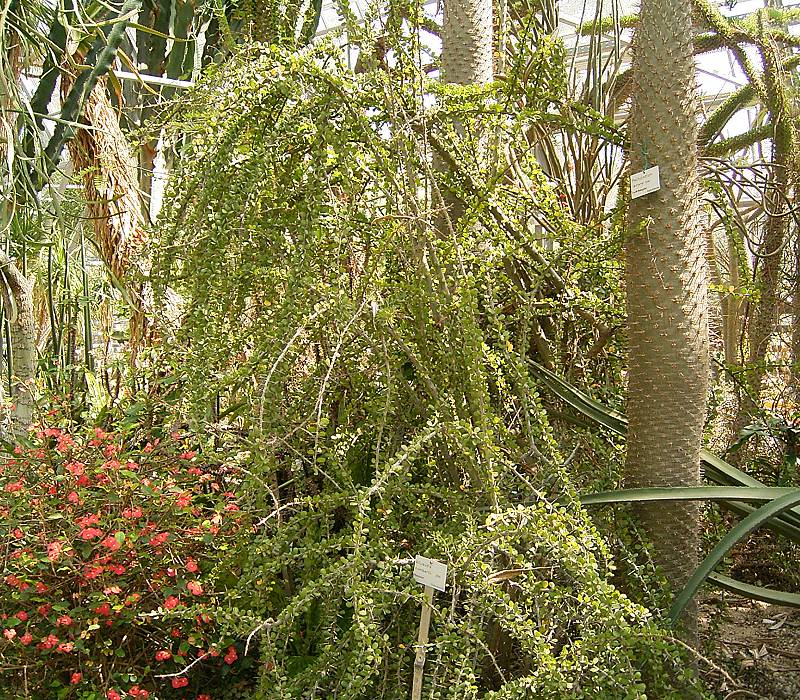
