= Vernoniopsis =

The scientific name Vernoniopsis may refer to:

- Vernoniopsis Dusén, a genus of plants from Brazil, with one species Vernoniopsis crassipes, a synonym of Chresta plantaginifolia
- Vernoniopsis Humbert, the illegitimate name of a genus of plants from Madagascar with the replacement name Jalantzia
