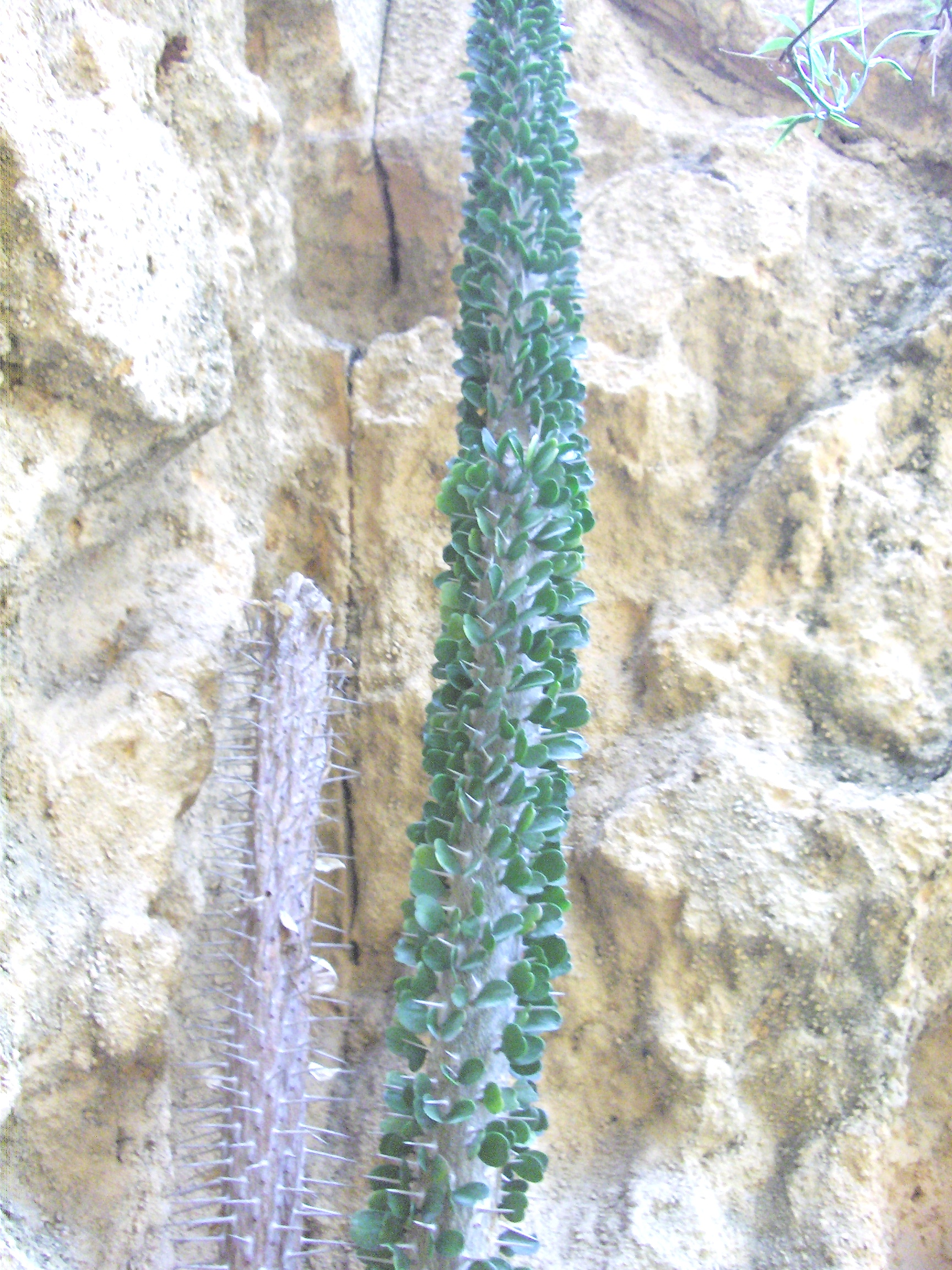

Conservation status
- Vulnerable (IUCN 3.1)

Scientific classification
- Kingdom: Plantae
- Clade: Tracheophytes
- Clade: Angiosperms
- Clade: Eudicots
- Order: Caryophyllales
- Family: Didiereaceae
- Genus: Alluaudia
- Species: A. ascendens

Binomial name
- Alluaudia ascendens Drake

Synonyms
- Didierea ascendens Drake

= Alluaudia ascendens =

Species of flowering plant

Alluaudia ascendens is a species of Alluaudia endemic to Madagascar. It can reach 15 m in height. Its local name is fantsiolotse.

== Range and habitat ==
Alluaudia ascendens is native to Anosy region of southern Madagascar, where it is found in Taolagnaro, Andohahela, Ankodida, Behara-Tranomaro, and Ifotaky. The species' estimated extent of occurrence (EOO) is 2,417 km^{2}, and its estimated area of occupancy (AOO) is 44 km^{2}

it is native to the southeastern portion of the Madagascar spiny thickets ecoregion, where it inhabits dry spiny thicket and dry degraded thicket from sea level up to 499 meters elevation. Alluaudia ascendens is found in the open upper canopy of the thickets, in association with the baobab Adansonia za, Alluaudia procera, Operculicarya decaryi, Commiphora aprevalii, and Tetrapterocarpon geayi.

== Ecology ==
Alluaudia ascendens is pollinated by bats. Verreaux's sifaka (Propithecus verrauxii), a native lemur, consumes its flowers.
