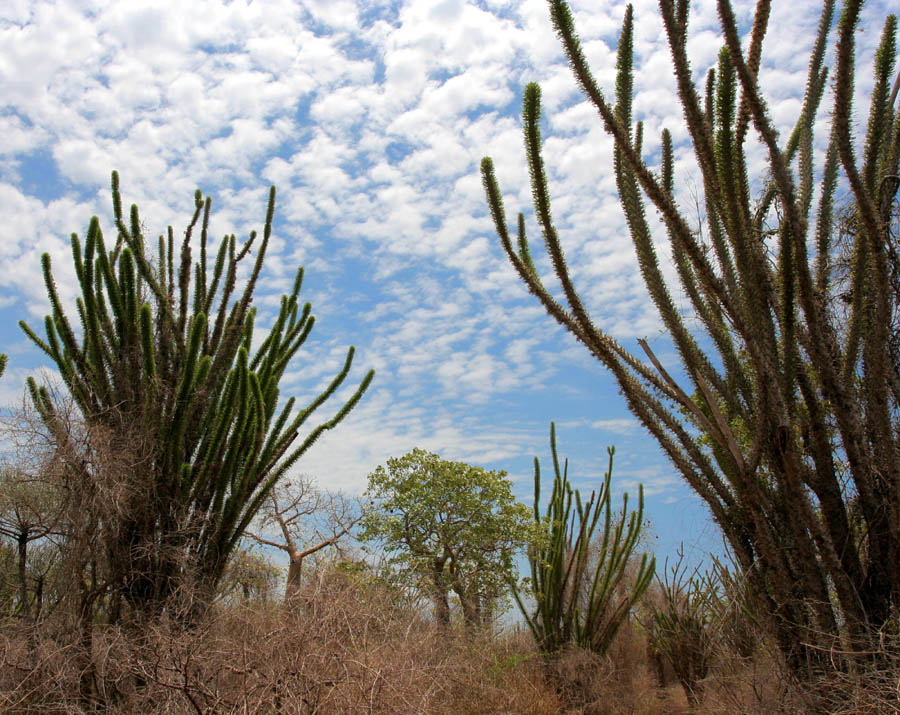
- Alluaudia procera

Scientific classification
- Kingdom: Plantae
- Clade: Tracheophytes
- Clade: Angiosperms
- Clade: Eudicots
- Order: Caryophyllales
- Family: Didiereaceae
- Subfamily: Didiereoideae
- Genus: Alluaudia (Drake) Drake

Type species
- Alluaudia procera (Drake) Drake, 1903

Species
- 6, see text

= Alluaudia =

Genus of flowering plants

Alluaudia is a genus of flowering plants in the family Didiereaceae. There are six species, all endemic to Madagascar.

Most occur in the southwestern subarid forest-thicket vegetation of the island.

Species of Alluaudia are dioecious, with male and female flowers on separate plants. Spines are arranged around the leaves as a defense against herbivores. The spines are several meters above the ground, and probably evolved in response to herbivory by now-extinct lemurs, such as Hadropithecus. Several lemur species living today feed heavily on Alluaudia, such as the ring-tailed lemur (Lemur catta) and the white-footed sportive lemur (Lepilemur leucopus).

== Species ==
Image	Scientific name	Distribution
	Alluaudia ascendens (Drake) Drake 1903	Madagascar
	Alluaudia comosa (Drake) Drake 1903	SW Madagascar.
	Alluaudia dumosa (Drake) Drake 1903	southern coastal Madagascar
	Alluaudia humbertii Choux 1934	Madagascar
	Alluaudia montagnacii Rauh 1961	Madagascar
	Alluaudia procera (Drake) Drake 1903	Madagascar
