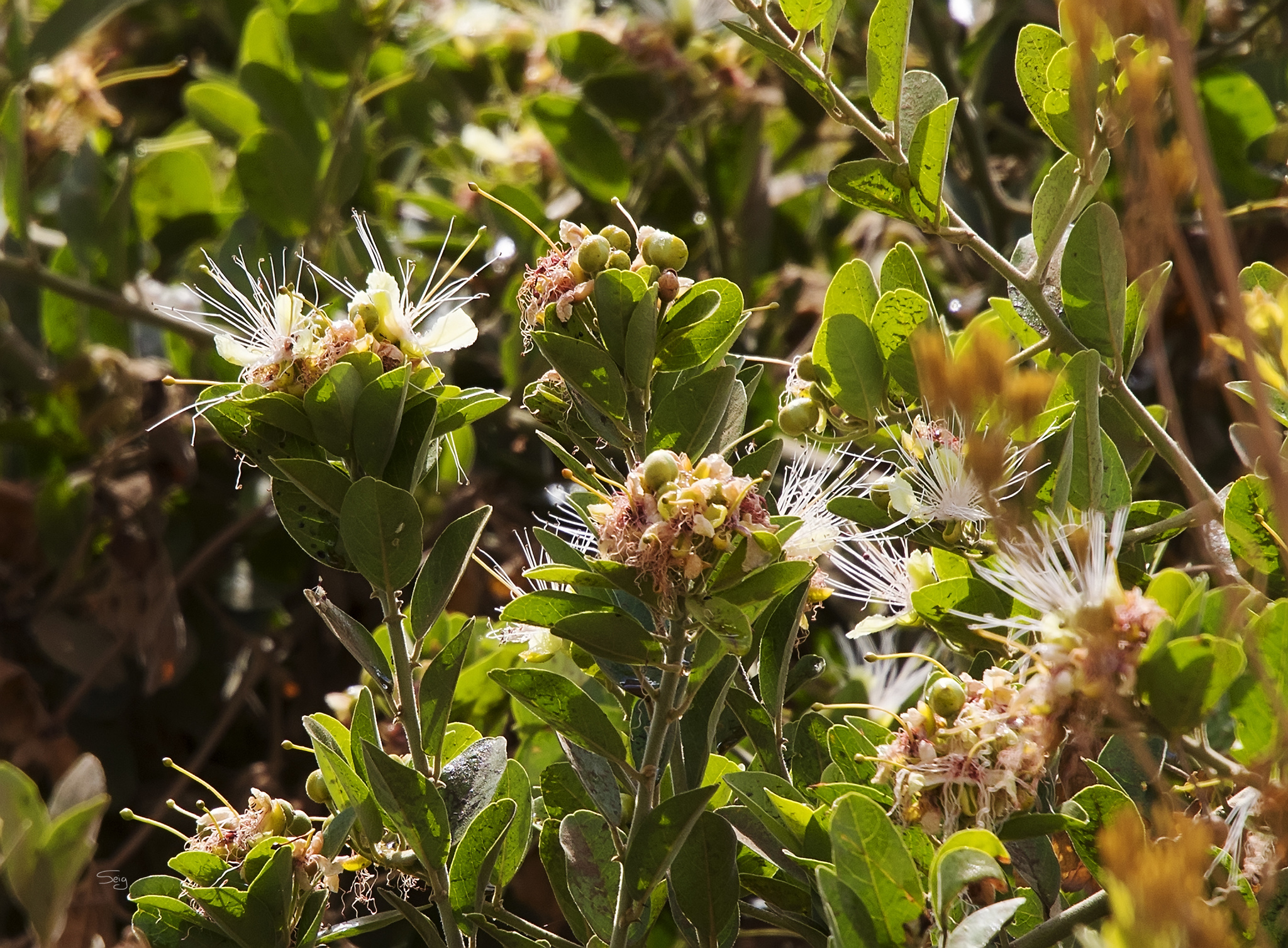
- Calyptrotheca somalensis

Scientific classification
- Kingdom: Plantae
- Clade: Tracheophytes
- Clade: Angiosperms
- Clade: Eudicots
- Order: Caryophyllales
- Family: Didiereaceae
- Genus: Calyptrotheca; Gilg

= Calyptrotheca =

Genus of flowering plants

Calyptrotheca is a genus of flowering plants belonging to the family Didiereaceae.

Its native range is north-eastern and eastern tropical Africa.

Species:

- Calyptrotheca somalensis Gilg
- Calyptrotheca taitensis (Pax & Vatke) Brenan
