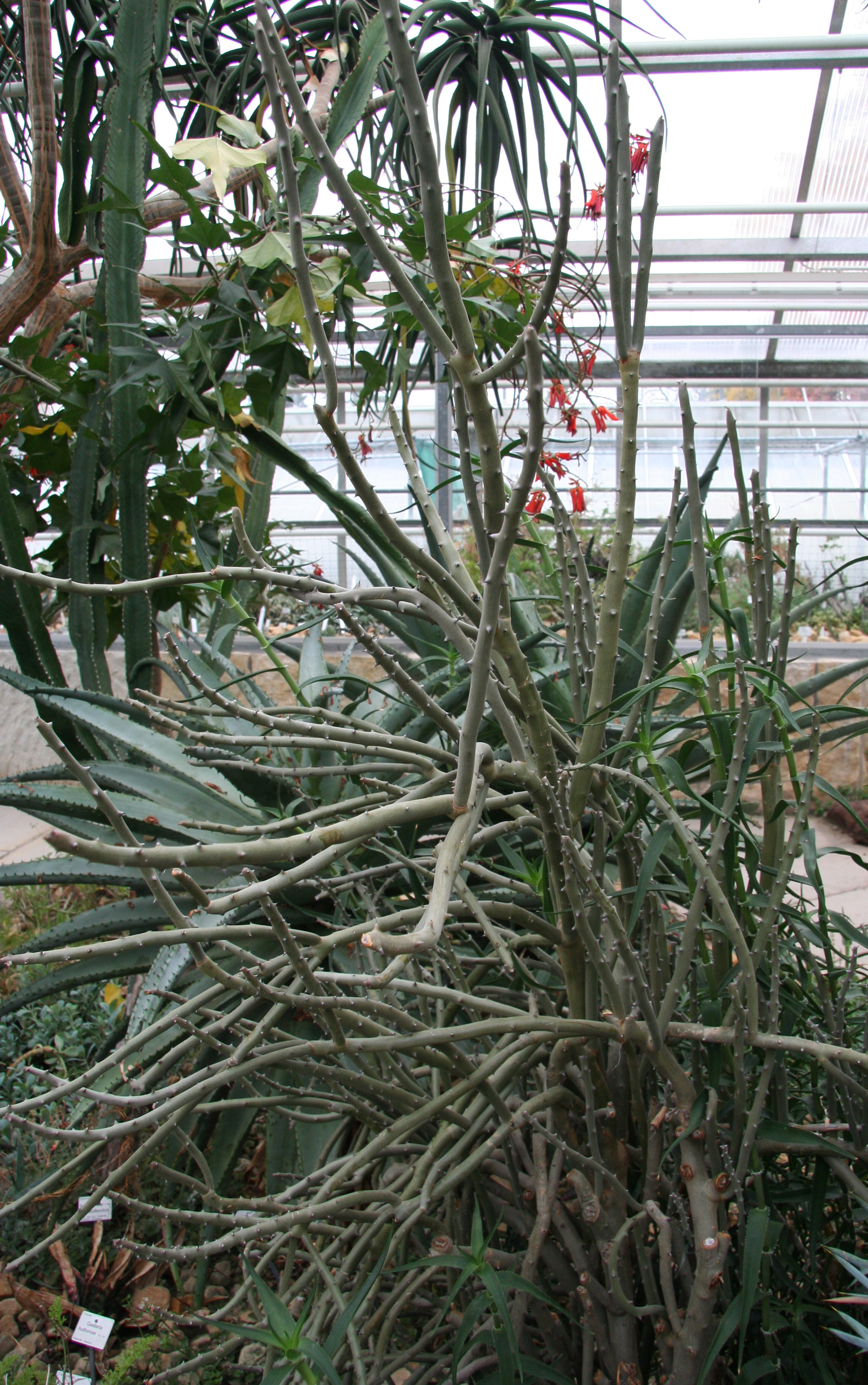

Scientific classification
- Kingdom: Plantae
- Clade: Tracheophytes
- Clade: Angiosperms
- Clade: Eudicots
- Order: Caryophyllales
- Family: Didiereaceae
- Genus: Alluaudia
- Species: A. dumosa

Binomial name
- Alluaudia dumosa (Drake) Drake

= Alluaudia dumosa =

Species of flowering plant

Alluaudia dumosa, also known as dense alluaudia or Boers' umbrella, is a species of plant in the genus Alluaudia and the family Didiereaceae.

== Etymology ==
The species name 'dumosa' (from Latin 'dumosus') means 'bushy, growing as a bush'.

== Description ==
Alluaudia dumosa initially grows as an upright shrub. Later, the shoots become prostrate and finally the plants grow tree-shaped. They reach heights of 2–6 m (6 ft 7 in – 19 ft 8 in). The thick and fleshy shoots are covered with tiny, scattered and weak, black thorns. These grow up to 2 mm (0.079 in) in size. The tender fleshy leaves are almost stem-round and soon fall off. They are 5 to 10 mm (0.20 to 0.39 in) long and 2 to 3 mm (0.079 to 0.118 in) in diameter.

The whitish flowers appear in small, cymous inflorescences and grow up to 5 cm (2.0 in) in size. The fruits are elongated in shape.

== Distribution and habitat ==
Alluaudia dumosa is distributed in the southeast of Madagascar, in the area between Ambovombe and Ampanihy. The species is on the IUCN Red List and is considered Least Concern.

Alluaudia dumosa was first formally described in 1901 as Didierea dumosa by French botanist, Emmanuel Drake del Castillo. In 1903, Castillo placed the species in the newly established genus Alluaudia.
