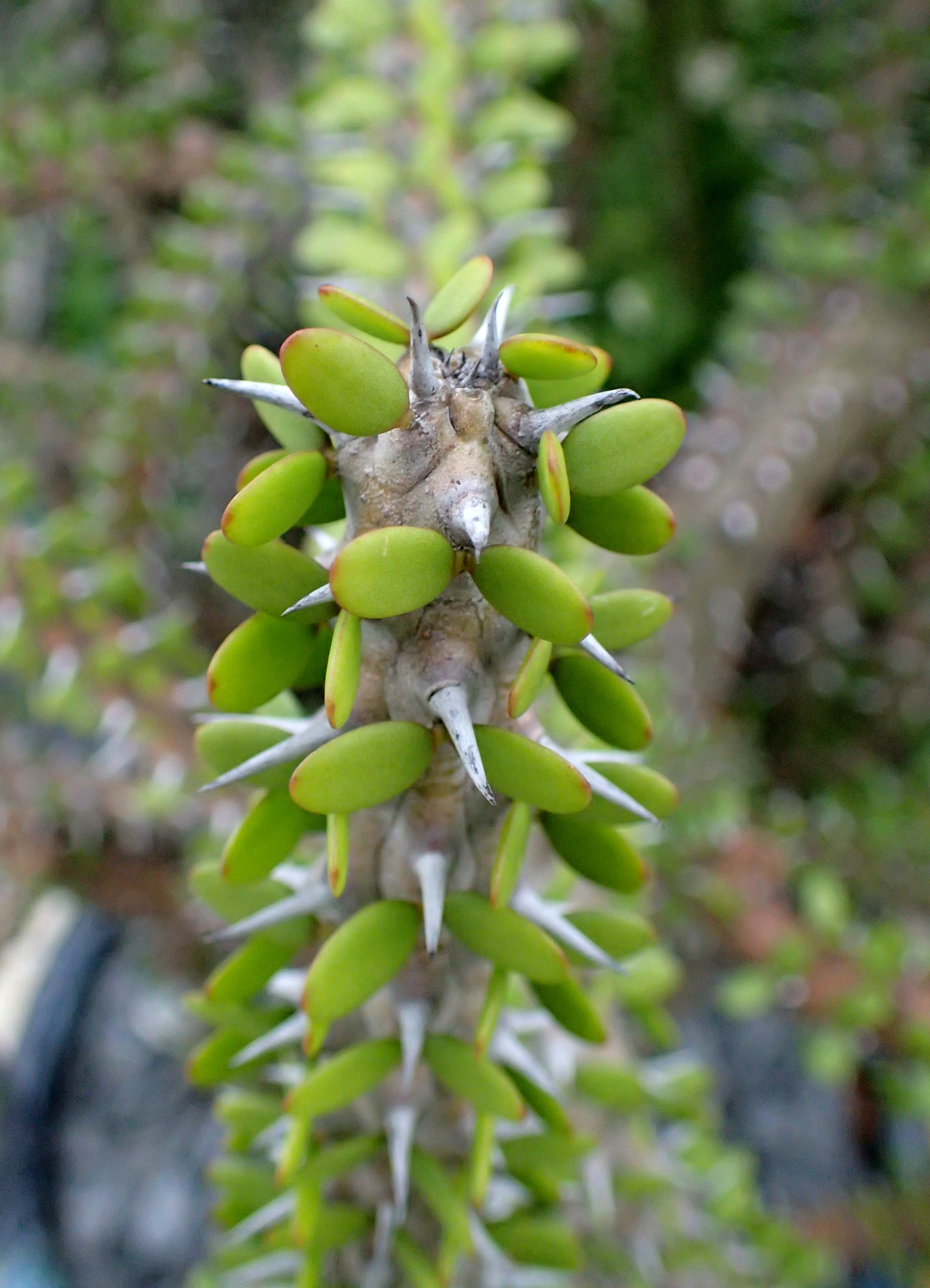

Conservation status
- Vulnerable (IUCN 3.1)

Scientific classification
- Kingdom: Plantae
- Clade: Tracheophytes
- Clade: Angiosperms
- Clade: Eudicots
- Order: Caryophyllales
- Family: Didiereaceae
- Genus: Alluaudia
- Species: A. comosa

Binomial name
- Alluaudia comosa (Drake) Drake

= Alluaudia comosa =

Species of flowering plant

Alluaudia comosa is a rare species of flowering plant. It belongs to the family Didiereaceae, subfamily Didiereoideae, which is found only in the coastal area of SW Madagascar. Didierea comosa Drake is a synonym. It is listed as "vulnerable" on the IUCN Red List of Threatened Species.

== Description ==
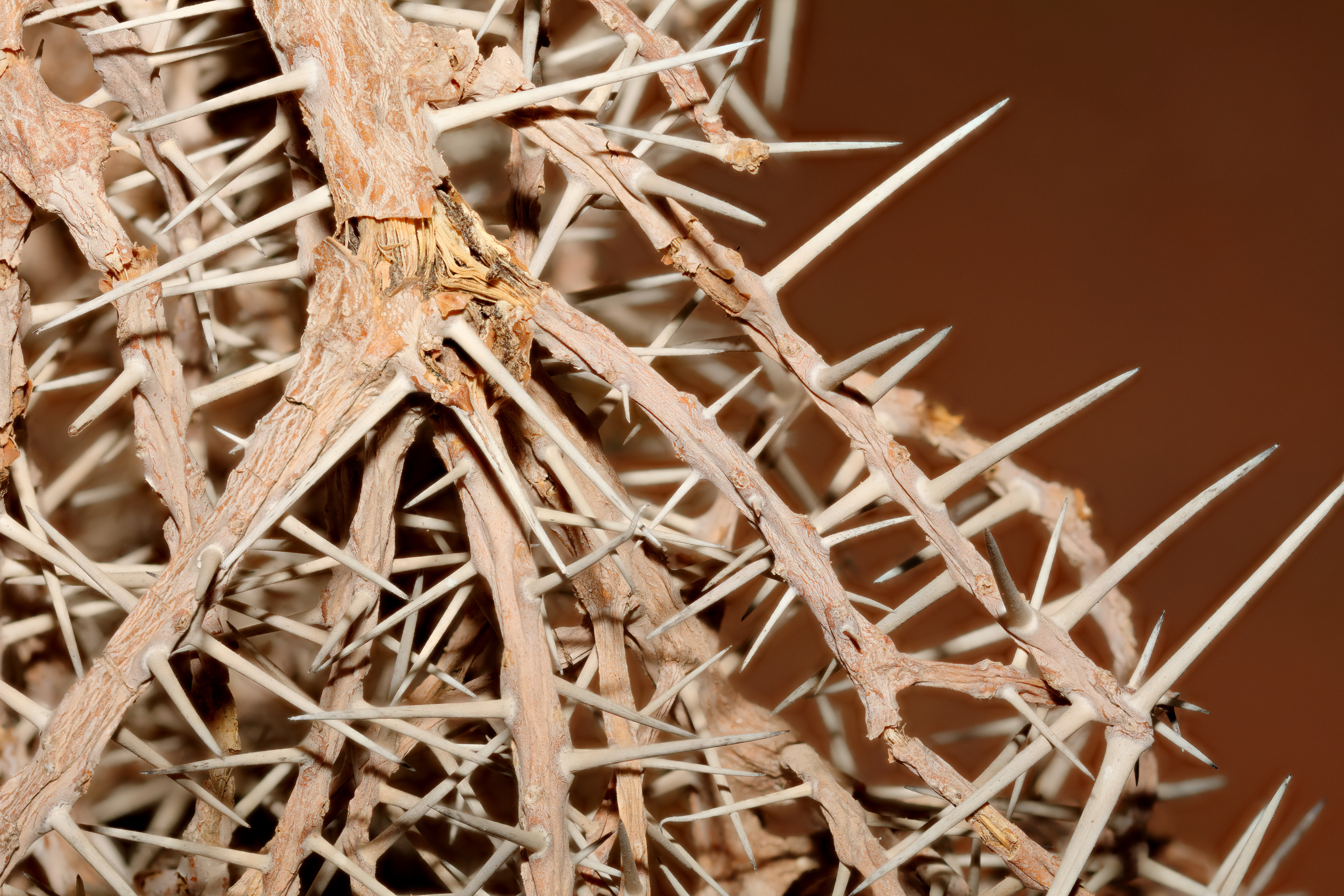
Spines of Alluaudia comosa

Alluaudia comosa has a distinctive, easily recognized silhouette with a short trunk and dense branches that stop in a flat crown. This is a deciduous shrub to small tree 2-6 (-10) metres tall that is woody, semi-succulent and spiny, with spines set singly. Spines are grey and 1.5-3.5 cm long.

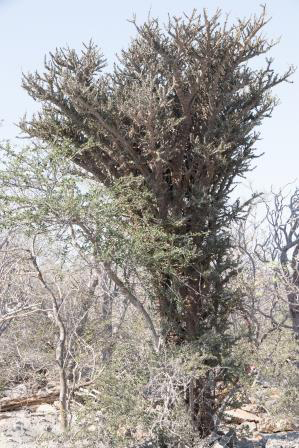

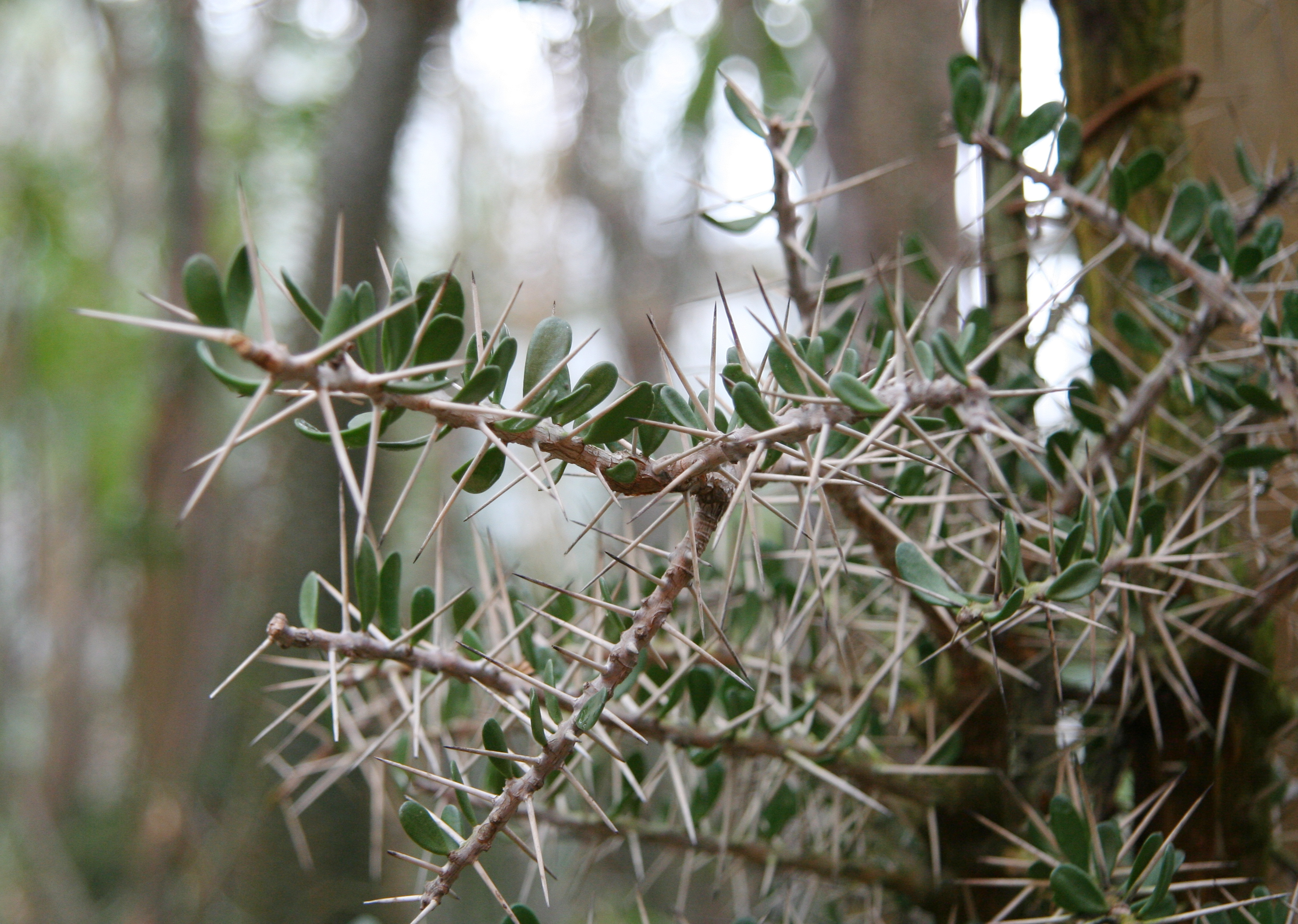

Leaves are developed mostly in pairs, set on a short stalk (petiole), dying off at the beginning of the dry season. They are rounded (10–22 mm X 10 mm) and fleshy.

== Flowers ==
Flowers are produced on a reduced inflorescence in Alluaudia comosa; only the end flower develops and is set on a very short axis. Flowers are dioecious (male and female flowers on separate plants).

== Habitat ==
This species grows on limestone in dry forests or coastal shrubland.
