= Jalantzia caudata =

Scientific classification
- Kingdom: Plantae
- Clade: Tracheophytes
- Clade: Angiosperms
- Clade: Eudicots
- Clade: Asterids
- Order: Asterales
- Family: Asteraceae
- Genus: Jalantzia
- Species: J. caudata

Binomial name
- Jalantzia caudata (Drake) D.J.N.Hind

Synonyms
- Vernonia caudata Drake; Vernonia sanctae-mariae Drake; Vernoniopsis caudata (Drake) Humbert

Species of plant

Jalantzia caudata is a species of flowering plant in the family Asteraceae, native to Madagascar. It was first described in 1899 as Vernonia caudata. It has also been known as Vernoniopsis caudata, but the genus Vernoniopsis Humbert is an illegitimate name.
