= Jalantzia =

Scientific classification
- Kingdom: Plantae
- Clade: Tracheophytes
- Clade: Angiosperms
- Clade: Eudicots
- Clade: Asterids
- Order: Asterales
- Family: Asteraceae
- Subfamily: Asteroideae
- Tribe: Astereae
- Genus: Jalantzia; D.J.N.Hind

Synonyms
- Vernoniopsis Humbert, nom. illeg., replaced synonym

Genus of flowering plants

Jalantzia is a genus of flowering plants in the aster tribe Astereae within the sunflower family Asteraceae. It was previously known as Vernoniopsis Humbert, an illegitimate name. Its species are native to Madagascar.

== Taxonomy ==
The genus name Vernoniopsis was first used by Per Karl Hjalmar Dusén in 1921. Dusén described one species, Vernoniopsis crassipes, from Brazil, which has since been synonymized with Vernonia plantaginifolia (as of May 2024 treated as either Pycnocephalum plantaginifolium or Chresta plantaginifolia). Dusén's Vernoniopsis is placed in tribe Vernonieae. In 1955, Jean-Henri Humbert used the same name for a new genus, in which he placed a species from Madagascar originally described as Vernonia caudata. Humbert's genus name, being a later homonym, is illegitimate. In 2024, the replacement name Jalantzia was published for Vernoniopsis Humbert. The genus is placed in the tribe Astereae.

== Species ==
As of May 2024, two species are accepted, both native to Madagascar.

- Jalantzia caudata (Drake) D.J.N.Hind, syn. Vernoniopsis caudata (Drake) Humbert
- Jalantzia lokohensis (Humbert) D.J.N. Hind, syn. Vernoniopsis caudata subsp. lokohensis Humbert
