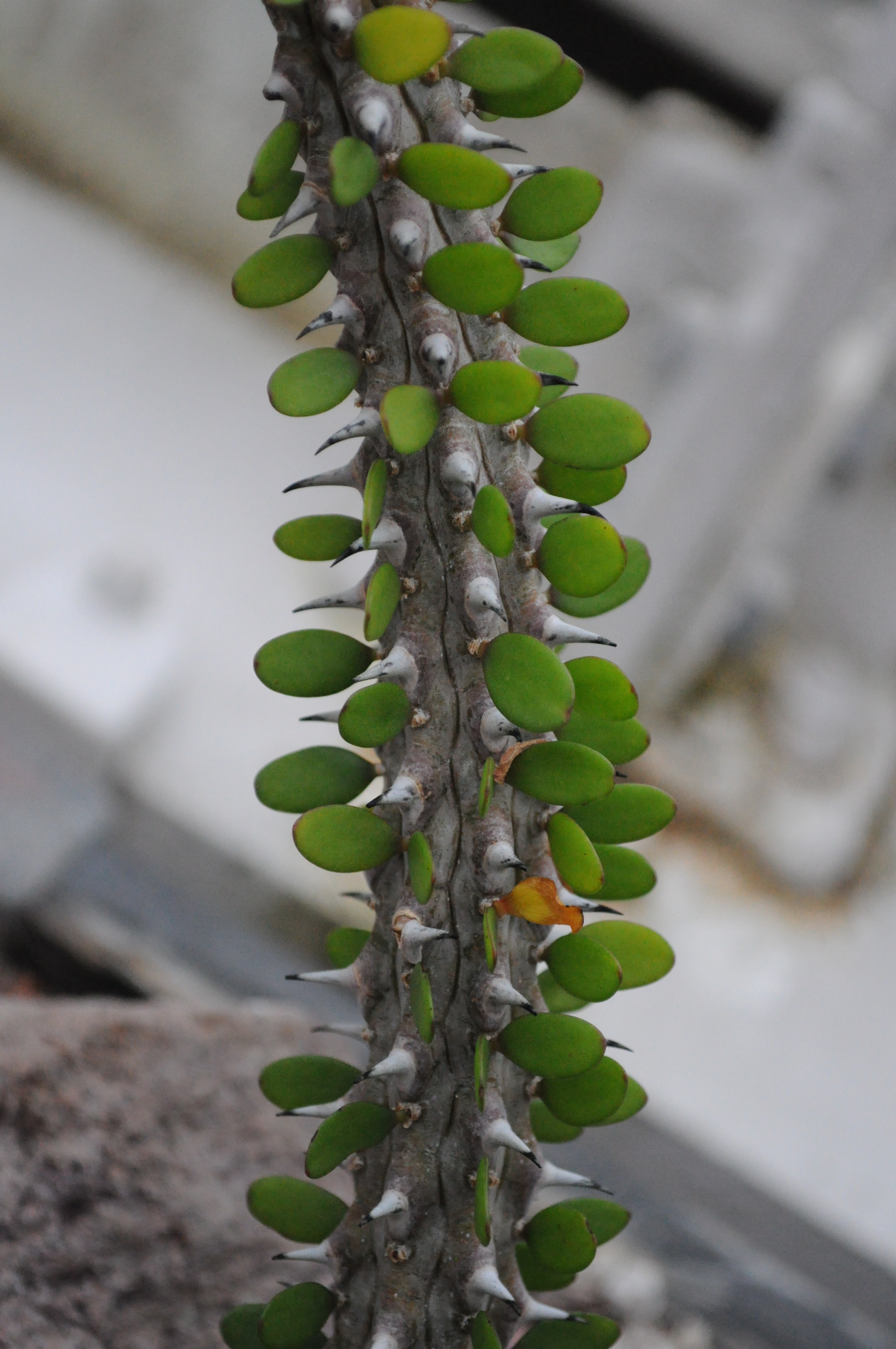

Conservation status
- Least Concern (IUCN 3.1)

Scientific classification
- Kingdom: Plantae
- Clade: Tracheophytes
- Clade: Angiosperms
- Clade: Eudicots
- Order: Caryophyllales
- Family: Didiereaceae
- Genus: Alluaudia
- Species: A. procera

Binomial name
- Alluaudia procera (Drake) Drake

Synonyms
- Didierea procera Drake

= Alluaudia procera =

Species of flowering plant

Alluaudia procera, or Madagascar ocotillo, is a deciduous succulent plant species of the family Didiereaceae. It is endemic to south Madagascar.

== Description ==
This plant is a spiny succulent shrub, with thick water-storing stems and leaves that are deciduous in the long dry season. Although strikingly similar in appearance, it is not closely related to the ocotillo, Fouquieria splendens of the Sonoran Deserts in North America.

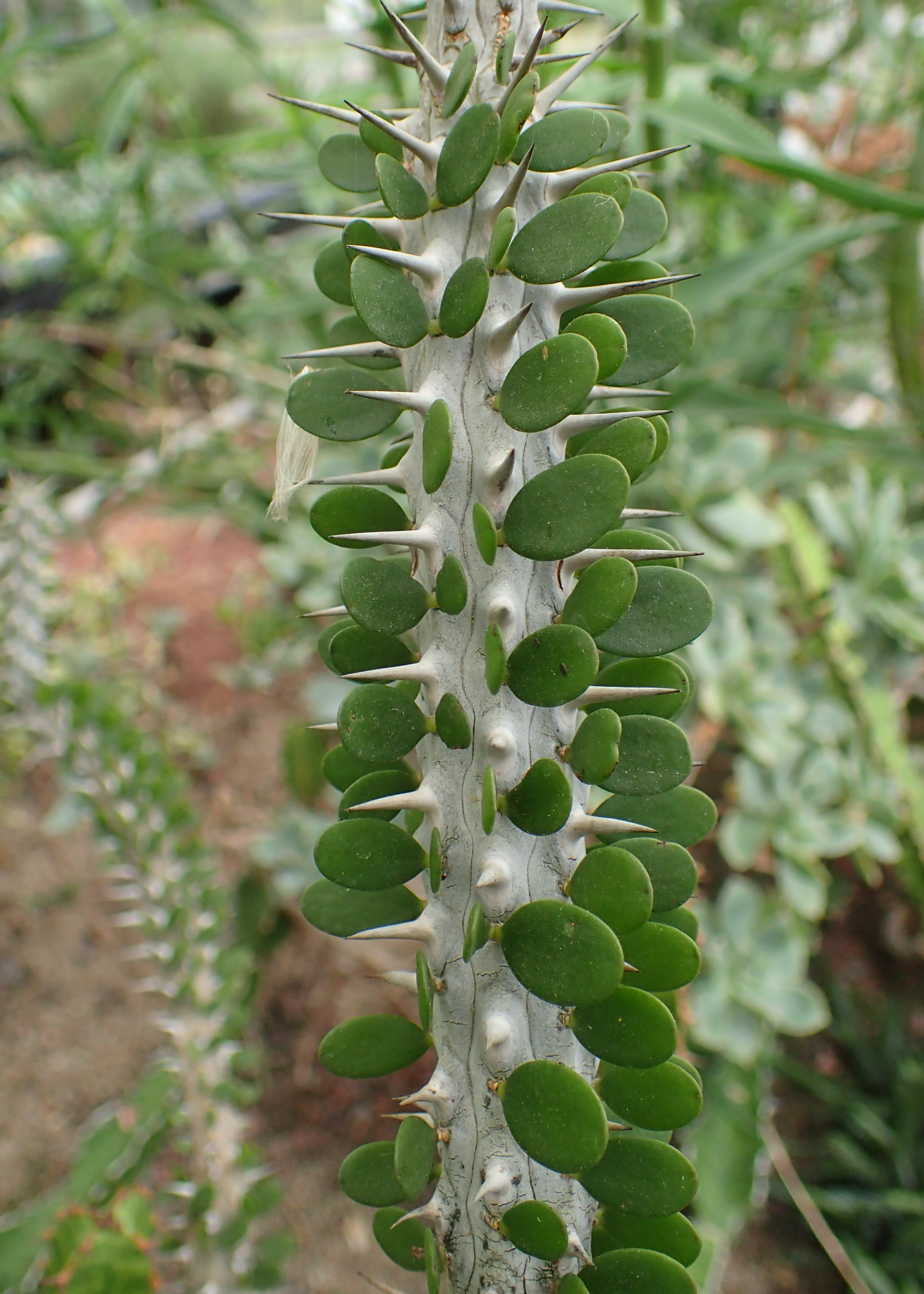

Young alluaudias form a tangle of stems that last for several years, after which a strong central stem develops. The basal stems then die out, leaving a tree-like stem that branches higher up on the main trunk. This main stem can grow up to 15m tall. The stems are covered in green oval leaves, measuring an average of 2.5cm long. The small green-yellow flowers grow in clusters on the tops of stems.

Like other members of family Didiereaceae, the leaves of Alluaudia, produced from brachyblasts similar to the areoles found in cacti, are small, appear single and are accompanied with conical spines. Its flowers are unisexual and radially symmetric.

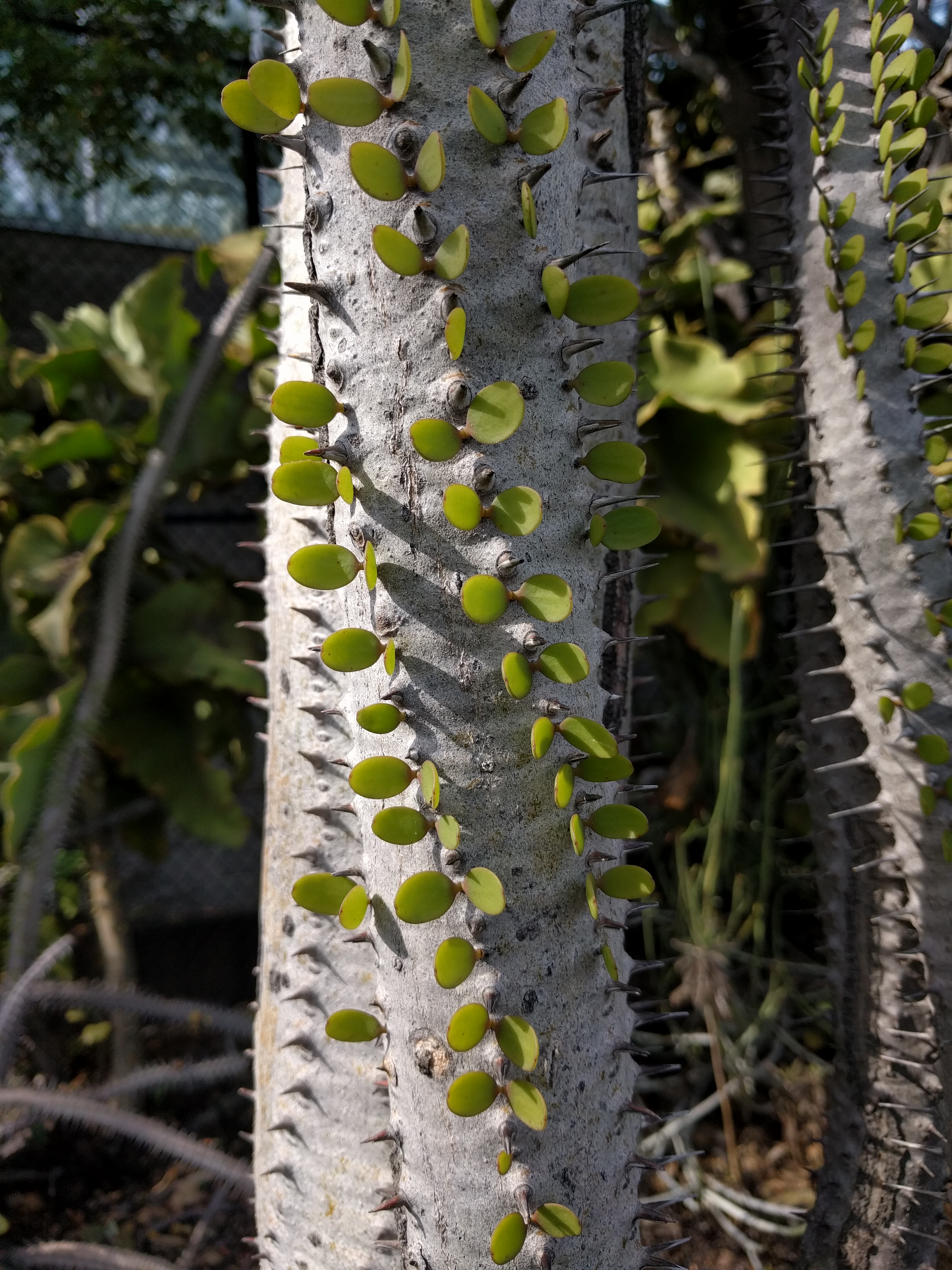
Alluaudia procera closeup of stem and leaves.

== Taxonomy ==
The Didiereaceae comprise 11 species divided into 4 genera, of which the largest is Alluaudia (six species). Alluaudia has been subdivided into the 2 sections Alluaudia and Androyella. In this way, Alluaudia procera has two sisters, Alluaudia ascendens and Alluaudia montagnacii.

Based on molecular phylogeny conducted Alluaudia, Alluaudiopsis, and Didierea from the family are all supported as monophyletic. Relationships within the genus Alluaudia are relevant to the evolution of polyploidy within the family.

Researchers haven't figured out where the family Didiereaceae originates. However, the nearest relative of the Didiereaceae, Calyptrotheca somalensis, is endemic to East Africa, from which the island of Madagascar separated 100 million years ago. Thus, the Didiereaceae may have originated from the dispersal to Madagascar of a Calyptrotheca-like East African ancestor.
