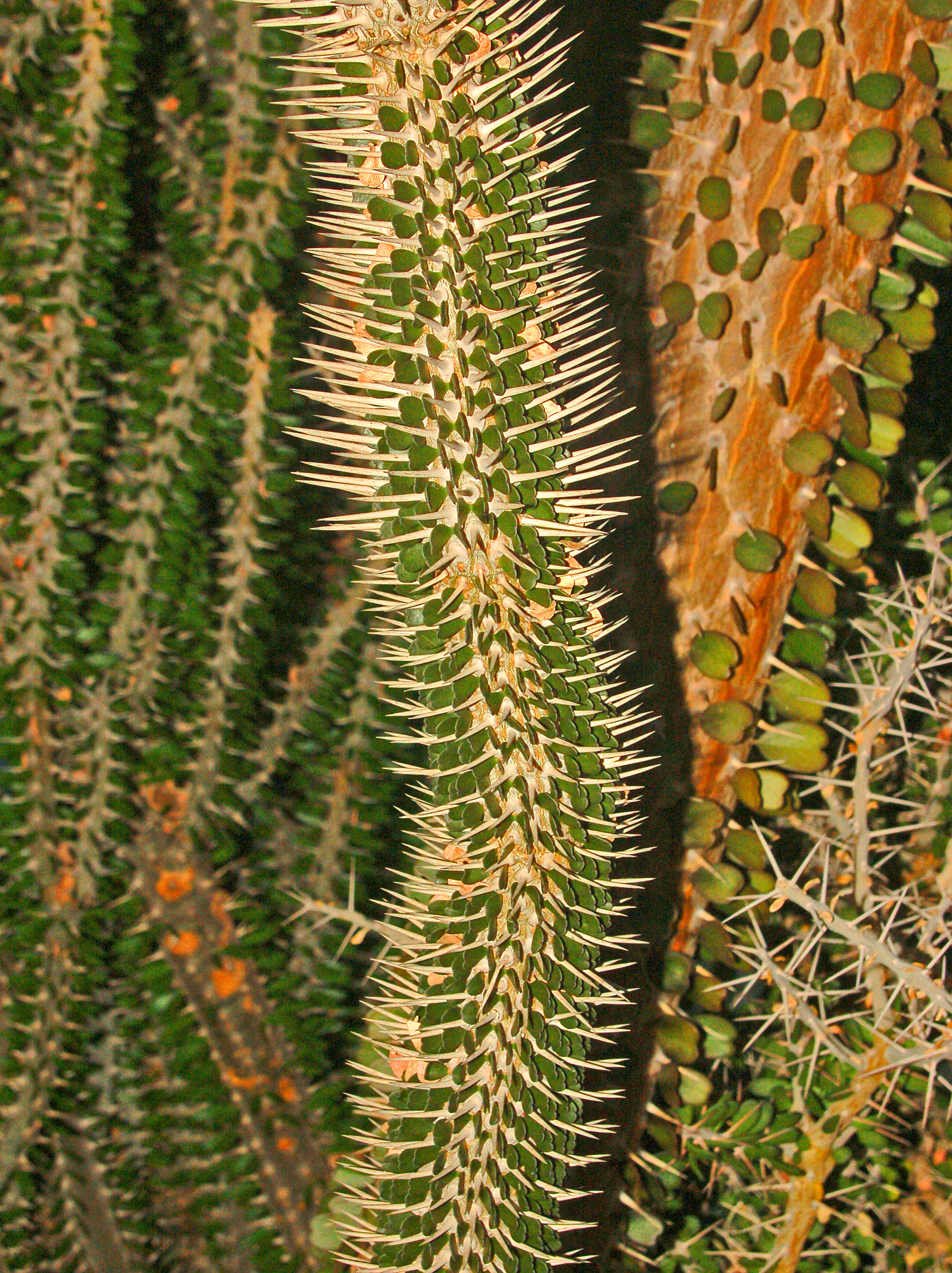
- At the botanical garden of Villa Durazzo-Pallavicini, Genova Pegli

Conservation status
- Endangered (IUCN 3.1)

Scientific classification
- Kingdom: Plantae
- Clade: Tracheophytes
- Clade: Angiosperms
- Clade: Eudicots
- Order: Caryophyllales
- Family: Didiereaceae
- Genus: Alluaudia
- Species: A. montagnacii

Binomial name
- Alluaudia montagnacii Rauh

= Alluaudia montagnacii =

Species of flowering plant

Alluaudia montagnacii is a rare species of flowering plant in the family Didiereaceae.

== Description ==
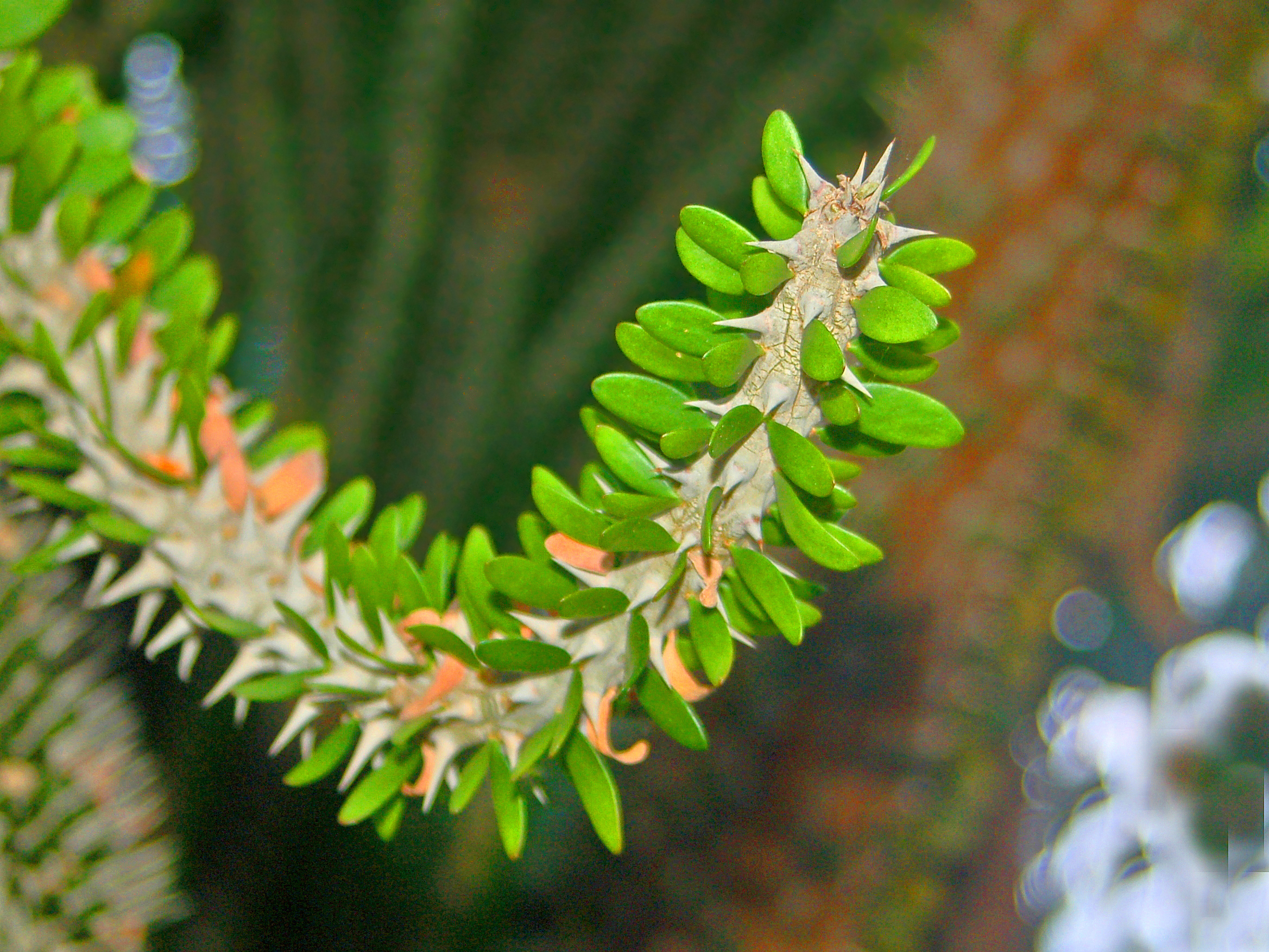
Branch and leaves

Alluaudia montagnacii can reach a height of 2.4–6 m (7 ft 10 in – 19 ft 8 in). The tall columnar central trunk sprouts strong vertical branches. Stem and branches have symmetrically arranged leaves, about 1.5 cm (0.59 in) long, and black-tipped thorns, 2–2.5 cm (0.79–0.98 in) long. Leaves are deciduous in the long dry season. Photosynthesis is carried on by the stems. This plant is well adapted to live where water is a limiting environmental factor. The flowers are small, green or yellow.

== Distribution and habitat ==
Alluaudia montagnacii is endemic to the Mahafaly Plateau of southwestern Madagascar. It grows in small arid and subarid areas on a narrow belt of the coast. It is part of the Madagascar spiny forests, where it forms a specific plant community with species such as Cedrelopsis grevei and Ficus marmorata.
