= Jean-Henri Humbert =

French botanist

- Born: 24 January 1887
- Died: 20 October 1967 (aged 80)
- Occupation: Botanist

Jean-Henri Humbert (24 January 1887 – 20 October 1967) was a French botanist born in Paris.

He studied physics, chemistry and natural sciences in Rennes and Paris, and following a scientific excursion to Madagascar, he worked as a university assistant at the faculty of Clermont-Ferrand (from 1913). In 1919 he was appointed to the chair of botany, subsequently teaching botany classes at the institute of chemistry and industrial technology (1920–22). In 1922 he relocated to Algiers, where he became chef de travaux to the faculty of sciences. In 1931 he succeeded Henri Lecomte (1856-1934) as chair of botany at the Muséum national d'histoire naturelle in Paris.

Humbert was a member of the Académie des sciences d'outre-mer (1938) and the Société botanique de France, serving as its president from 1940 to 1944. He was also a member of the Institut de France and the Société d’Histoire Naturelle de l’Afrique du Nord. From 1951 to 1957 he was a member of the Académie des Sciences.

He has a handful of botanical genera named after him, including Alluaudia humbertii, and Humbertiella from the tribe Hibisceae. He was an editor of the journal "Flore de Madagascar et des Comores" (Flora of Madagascar and the Comoros).

== Written works ==
- Les Composées de Madagascar, 1923
- Végétation du Grand Atlas Marocain oriental. Exploration botanique de l'Ari Ayachi, 1924 (Vegetation of the Great Eastern Moroccan Atlas Mountains. Botanical exploration of the Ari Ayachi).
- La Disparition des forêts à Madagascar, 1927 (The disappearance of the forests of Madagascar).
