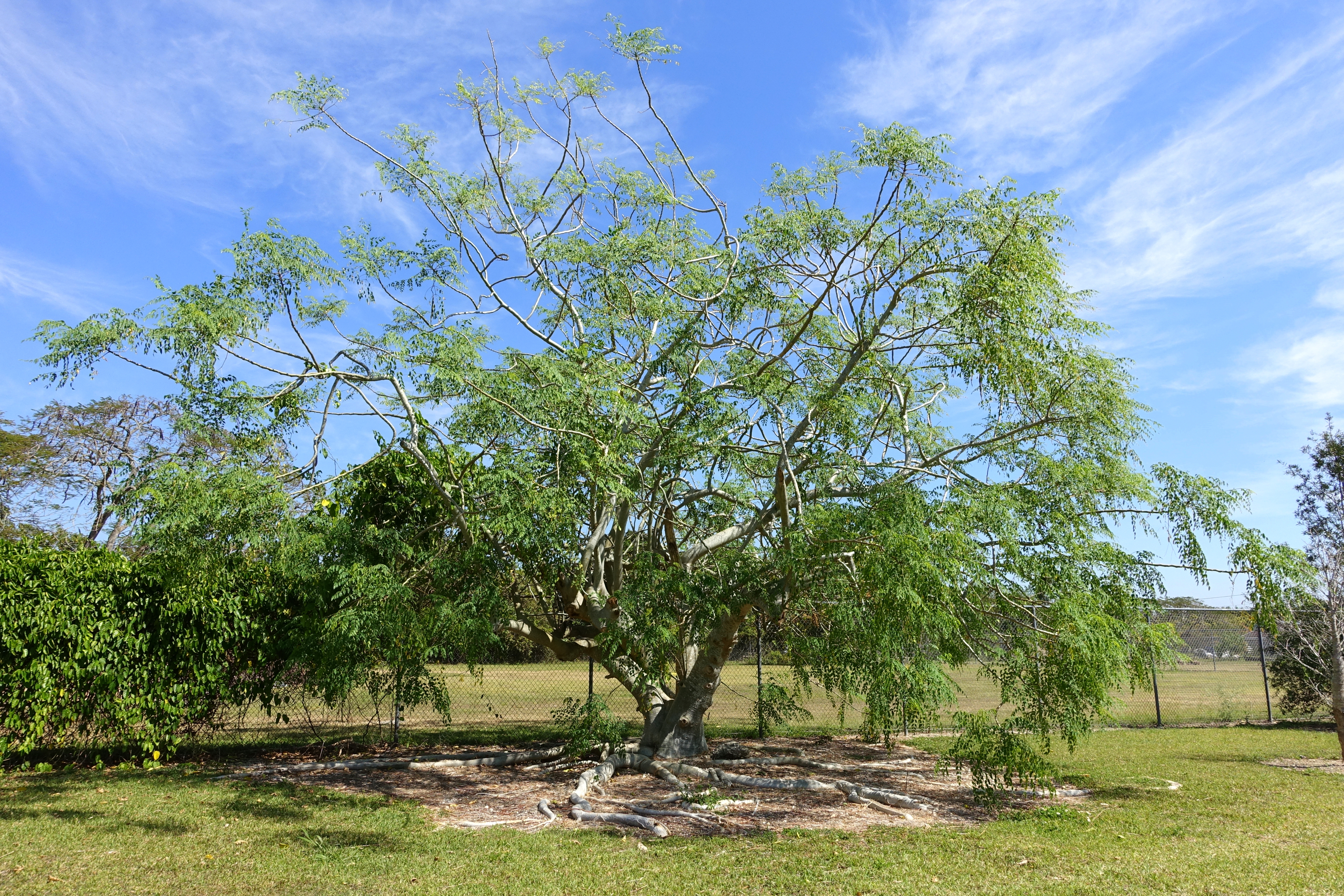
- A specimen at the Fruit and Spice Park in Redland, Florida
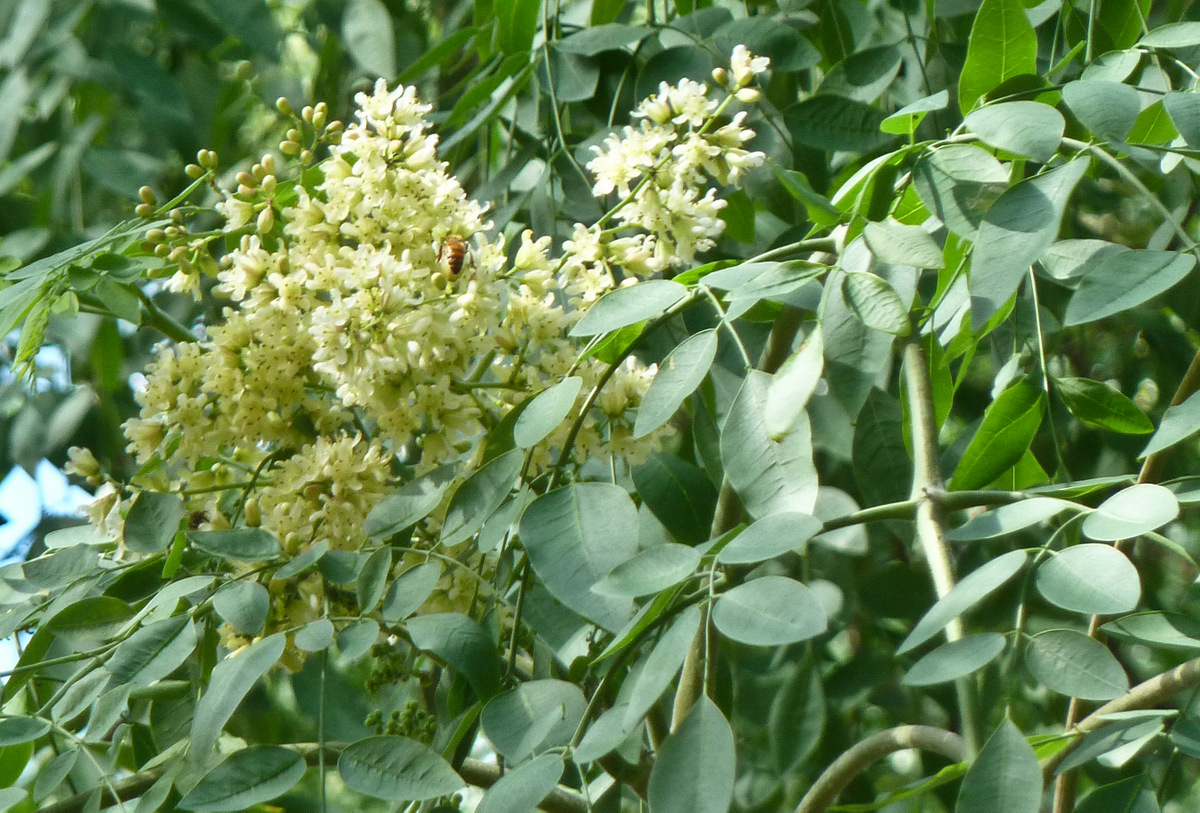
- Flowers and leaves, photographed on Oahu, Hawaii

Scientific classification
- Kingdom: Plantae
- Clade: Tracheophytes
- Clade: Angiosperms
- Clade: Eudicots
- Clade: Rosids
- Order: Brassicales
- Family: Moringaceae
- Genus: Moringa
- Species: M. stenopetala

Binomial name
- Moringa stenopetala (Baker f.) Cufod.

Synonyms
- Donaldsonia stenopetala Baker f. (basionym); Moringa streptocarpa Chiov.

= Moringa stenopetala =

Species of tree

Moringa stenopetala, commonly known as the African Moringa or cabbage tree, is a deciduous tree in the plant genus Moringa, native to Kenya and Ethiopia. A drought-resistant species, it is characterized by its bottle-shaped trunk, long twisted seed pods, and edible leaves likened to cabbage, from which its common name is derived. M. stenopetala is extirpated in the wild in Ethiopia, though still grown there as a crop on the terraces of the Ethiopian Highlands, mainly in the Konso region.

Like its widely cultivated relative M. oleifera, Moringa stenopetala is a multipurpose tree: the leaves, pods, and flowers are edible and nutritious; the seeds contain an aromatic oil with culinary and cosmetic applications; and the seed press cake or powdered bark can be used for water purification. It is featured in various dishes and has a history of uses in folk medicine throughout its native range.

== Taxonomy ==
The species was first described as Donaldsonia stenopetala by botanist Edmund G. Baker in 1896, based on the type specimen collected by Donaldson Smith along the northeastern shore of Lake Turkana. Emilio Chiovenda later described another specimen from Kenya as Moringa streptocarpa. In 1957, Georg Cufodontis identified these specimens to be morphologically similar and designated them as Moringa stenopetala, the officially accepted species name. The specific epithet stenopetala is derived from the Greek words stenos (narrow or straight) and petalum (petal), a reference to the shape of its petals.

Along with at least twelve other species, M. stenopetala belongs to the monotypic genus Moringa, which is the sole representative of the family Moringaceae. Researchers have divided these species into three distinct groups: Moringa with eight, Dysmoringa with one, and Donadsonia with four. M. stenopetala belongs to the latter group, along with M. drouhardii and M. hildebrandtii, characterized by winged seeds and (almost) regular flowers with short receptacles and superior ovaries.

M. stenopetala is known under various vernacular names throughout its native regions, including (h)aleko in the Gidole language (Gamo Gofa), shelagda or telchada in the Konso language, and Shiferaw in Amharic. In English, it is most commonly known as the African Moringa or cabbage tree, though these names may be shared with other Moringa species from Africa.

== Description ==
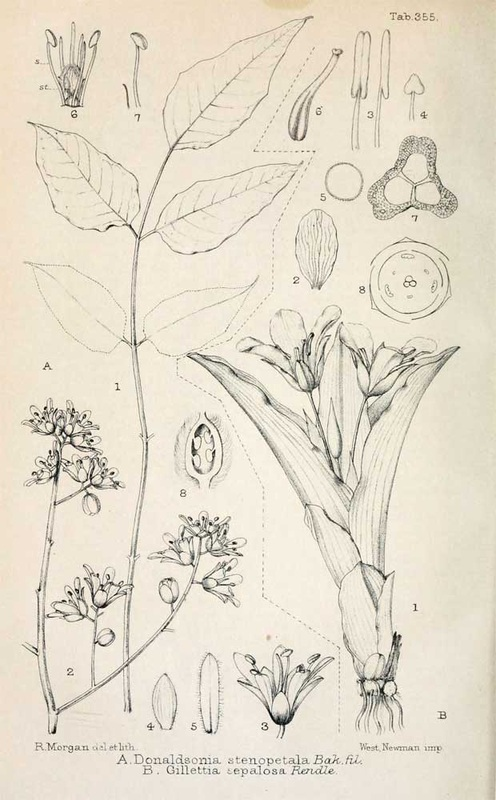
Illustration from the Journal of Botany, British and Foreign in 1896

Moringa stenopetala is a perennial tree with a shrubby, rounded habit, growing to a height of 6–12 m (20–39 ft) in all but the most exceptional cases where it may reach 15 m (49 ft) high. Caudiciform or "bottle shaped", the trunk is bloated at the base and habitually forked, with a diameter up to 1 m (3 ft 3 in). The bark is smooth and whitish to light gray or silver, harboring soft wood underneath. The crown is sprawling and heavily branched; younger shoots are characterized by a dense, velvety pubescence.

The leaves are light green when mature, up to 55 cm (22 in) long, and attached alternately to the stem by short petioles. They are bi- or tripinnate in composition, with about five pairs of pinnae and three to nine leaflets on each pinna. Each leaflet is 3.5–6.5 cm (1.4–2.6 in) × 2–3.5 cm (0.8–1.4 in) in size and elliptical to ovate in shape, with an acute tip and a round-to-cuneate base. Stipule-like extrafloral nectaries are typically present at the base of the leaves.

M. stenopetala features a busy, aromatic inflorescence, organized as dense panicles up to 60 cm (24 in) long. The individual flowers are bisexual, radially symmetrical, and pentamerous. The calyx is polysepalous and cream colored, sometimes flushed pink, with 4–7 mm (0.2–0.3 in) long sepals. The corolla is polypetalous and variably white, pale-yellow or yellow-green; its petals are roughly oblong in shape and 8–10 mm (0.3–0.4 in) in length. Each flower features five stamens with white 4–6.5 mm (0.2–0.3 in) long filaments and yellow 2 mm (0.1 in) long anthers, as well as an indeterminate number of shorter staminodes. The ovary is densely haired and superior, 2 mm (0.1 in) long and ovoid in shape, transitioning to a smooth cylindrical style sans stigmatic lobes.

The fruits comprise 19.7–50 cm (7.8–19.7 in) × 1.8–4 cm (0.7–1.6 in) elongate pods which are initially twisted but gradually straight, sometimes torose (bulbous) around the encapsulated seeds. Young pods are bright green, maturing to a reddish coloration with a grayish bloom. The fruits are dehiscent, splitting open along three prominent valves when mature and releasing up to 20 seeds each. Covered by a cream to brownish husk with three papery wings, the seeds are oblong to triangular, 2.5–3.5 cm (1.0–1.4 in) long and 1.5–2 cm (0.6–0.8 in) wide, containing a smooth, whitish grey kernel.

== Distribution, habitat and ecology ==
Sparsely distributed across the Horn of Africa, Moringa stenopetala is endemic to southern Ethiopia, northern Kenya, and possibly Somalia. Extant populations are poorly documented, but have been identified in the wild in at least five localities across the Kenyan Rift Valley—one on Ol Kokwe Island in Lake Baringo and four around the shores of Lake Turkana. Records of wild specimens from other east African countries, including Djibouti, Sudan, and Uganda, have been deemed unreliable. M. stenopetala trees are widely cultivated in southern Ethiopia, where they were likely sourced from a now-extinct population near Lake Chew Bahir. Since modern times, the species has steadily been introduced across tropical Africa: it is found as far west as Senegal and as far south as Malawi.

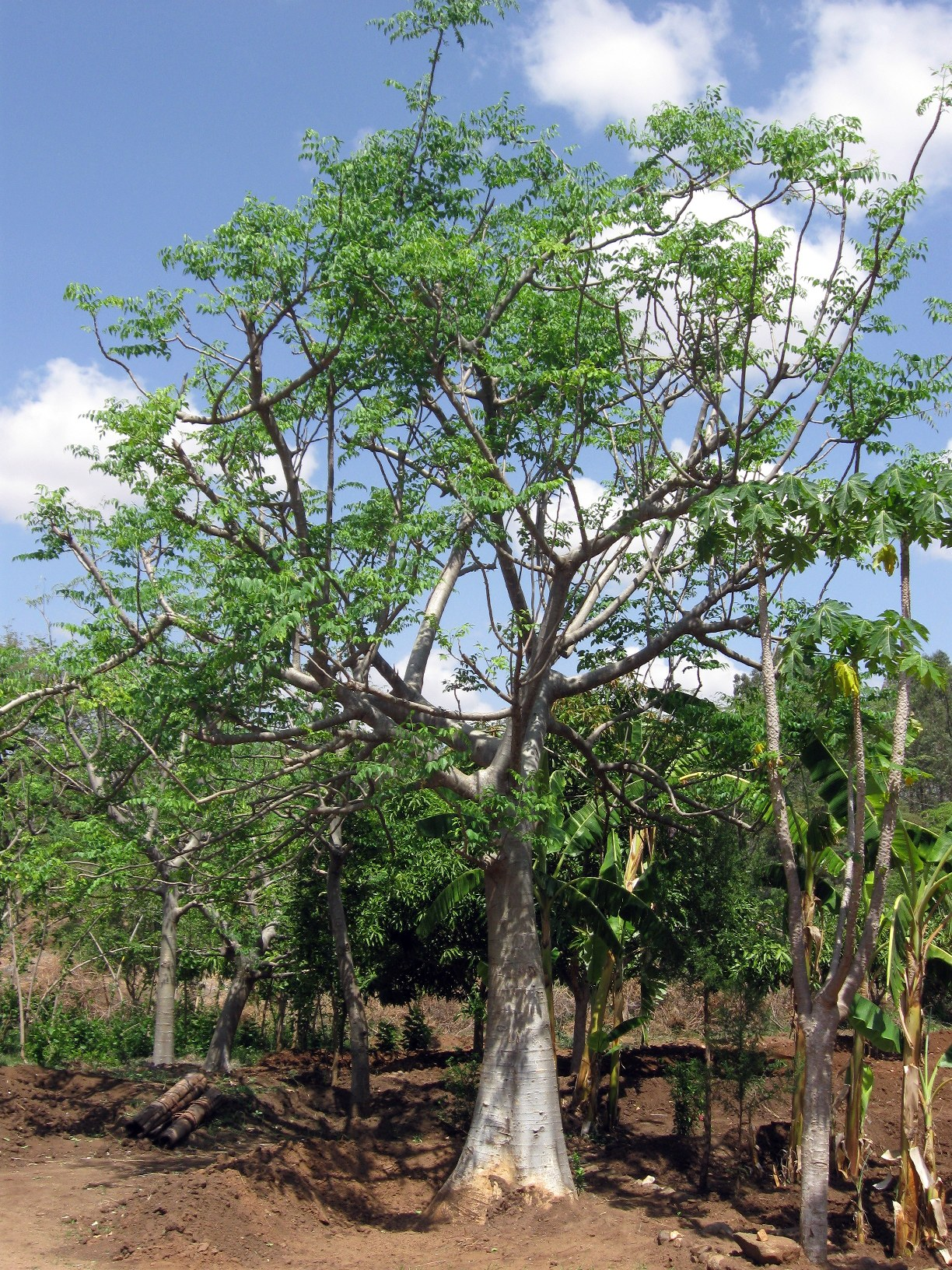
Habit in the Gurage Zone, Ethiopia

In the wild, M. stenopetala occurs in various habitats with different bioclimatic conditions and elevations of 400–1,200 m (1,300–3,900 ft). Its distribution range is arid to semi-arid, with an average annual rainfall of 500–1,400 mm (20–55 in) and mean temperatures of 24–30 °C (75–86 °F). Often growing near bodies of water, wild trees have been observed in drylands, shrublands, and woodlands, where they may form associations with Acacia tortilis, Delonix elata and Commiphora spp., as well as in wetlands, often associated with riverside species from Hyphaene, Salvadora and Cadaba. These regions are characterized by rocky or sandy soils, with good drainage and neutral to slightly acidic or alkaline soil reaction. The species is, however, known for its ability to subsist on a wide variety of (possibly very harsh) soil conditions; mature trees can even improve the fertility of the surrounding topsoil with their tendency to shed considerable amounts of organic matter.

Like its African relatives, M. stenopetala is well adapted to the severe heat and drought that characterize its native landscapes, where, given proper shading, it may survive temperatures up to 48 °C (118 °F). Developing early, the tuberous roots and bloated trunk form a prominent storage organ, which allows the plant to preserve water and thrive in drier climates. Although drought-deciduous, shedding its leaves towards the end of very prolonged dry seasons, it habitually grows as an evergreen under more moderate conditions. Light frost is tolerated, although persistent cold temperatures at higher growing elevations may eventually cause the tree to wither down to the base of its trunk, as well as inducing dormancy in seeds.

M. stenopetala trees live between 60 and 100 years, often with sustained productivity until the end of their lifespan. It is a quickly developing species; young plants can grow as high as 3 m (9.8 ft) in their first year and typically reach reproductive maturity after 2.5 years. From there on, the plants often continue to flower and fruit year-round. The flowers emit a sweet fragrance that encourages pollination by birds and insects alike. Mature seeds may be dispersed by either wind or water. The foliage provides nutritious forage for both wild and domesticated ruminants, whereas the flowers serve as an important source of nectar for honeybees.

== Cultivation ==
Moringa stenopetala was planted by agriculturalists on the complex system of terraces built high up in the Ethiopian Highlands, where they became domesticated and were bred to improve productivity, the taste of their leaves, and the size of their seeds. Since then, the improved trees have been introduced into other areas such as the Kenyan Rift Valley.

In present-day Ethiopia, M. stenopetala is mostly known for its importance as a nutritious vegetable food crop in the terraced fields of Konso, where it is cultivated for its leaves and pods. Propagation is easiest from seeds, although plants grown from cuttings may flower and fruit sooner (within several months). Kept moist and in full sun, seeds placed 1–2 cm deep in well-draining soil typically germinate about a week after sowing. Temperatures for optimal growth and production in the Ethiopian Rift Valley range from 15 to 33 °C (59 to 91 °F), corresponding with elevations of 1,150–1,800 m (3,770–5,910 ft). Collection of the leaves and fruits may start after two years, although traditional farmers usually wait 5 to 6 years before harvesting.

== Culinary use and nutrition ==
The leaves, seeds, flowers and young pods of M. stenopetala are all edible and commonly feature in dishes across its distribution range. Over 5 million people are estimated to consume M. stenopetala on a regular basis; it is especially favored by various ethnic groups of Ethiopia's SNNP Region.

=== Leaves ===
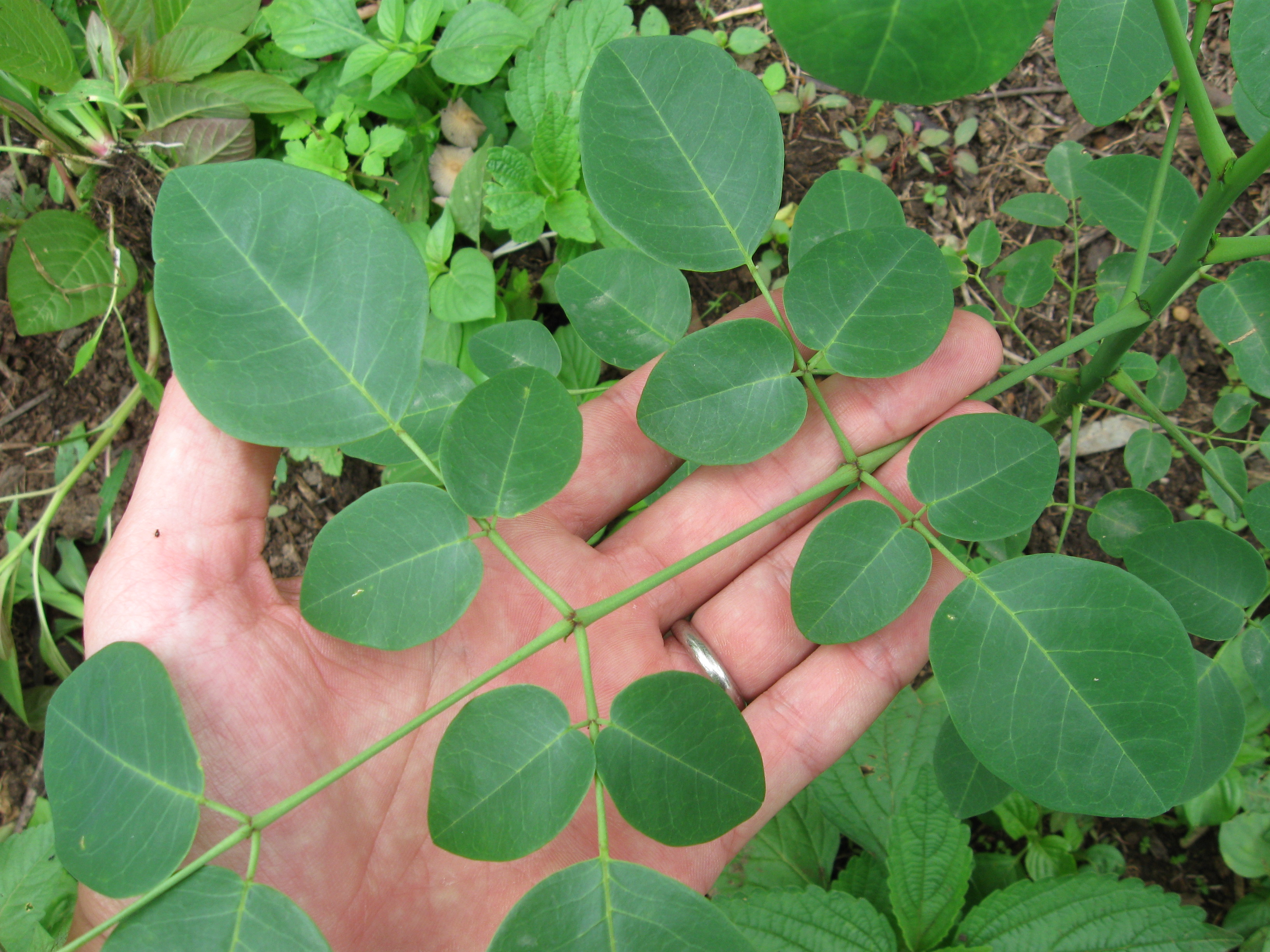
Leaves on a young plant, showing a pinnate composition

Like M. oleifera, the leaves of M. stenopetala make for a nutrient-dense edible green. A nutrition analysis of an Ethiopian sample yielded 28.44 g of protein, 0.7 g of fat, 38.49 g of carbohydrates and 11.62 g of crude fiber per 100 g dry weight, with a mean energy value of 274 kcal (1,146 kJ). Raw leaves are rich in vitamin C (28 mg/100 g), a good source of vitamin A, and comparable to cruciferous vegetables for their significant mineral content (such as calcium, iron and phosphorus). Within the Moringa, M. stenopetala leaves are highest in sulfur and remarkably rich in protein. Variables that may affect the nutrient – particularly mineral – compositions of M. stenopetala include the season, growing elevations, and soil type. During the dry season, the average southern Ethiopian adult eats 150 g of fresh leaves per day, providing 19% of their energy and 30% of their protein requirements.

The taste of the leaves ranges from bitter to sweet, may vary per tree, and is described as more pleasant during the dry season. The leaflets are stripped from the rachis and eaten either raw or cooked like cabbage, inspiring the common name "cabbage tree". They may be served with bread as a nutritious addition to many meals. In the Konso region of Ethiopia, balls of mixed flours – and sometimes cereals – are typically boiled in salt water and served alongside the leaves. The Siltʼe people use cornmeal as the principal flour, and include onions and chilies to create a dish called kurkufa. In a variation of this preparation, known as fosesae, the cornmeal is first mixed with water to create a doughy consistency, and then cooked with the leaves and spices. Dried, crushed leaves may be added to chegga, a traditional sorghum brew of the Dirashe people.

=== Other parts ===
Because the fruits are slightly bitter, even when young, they are normally prepared only in times when other crops are scarce. The flowers may also be boiled or eaten fresh. The seeds yield an aromatic, edible oil that may be used for cooking or as a dressing for salads.

== Other uses ==
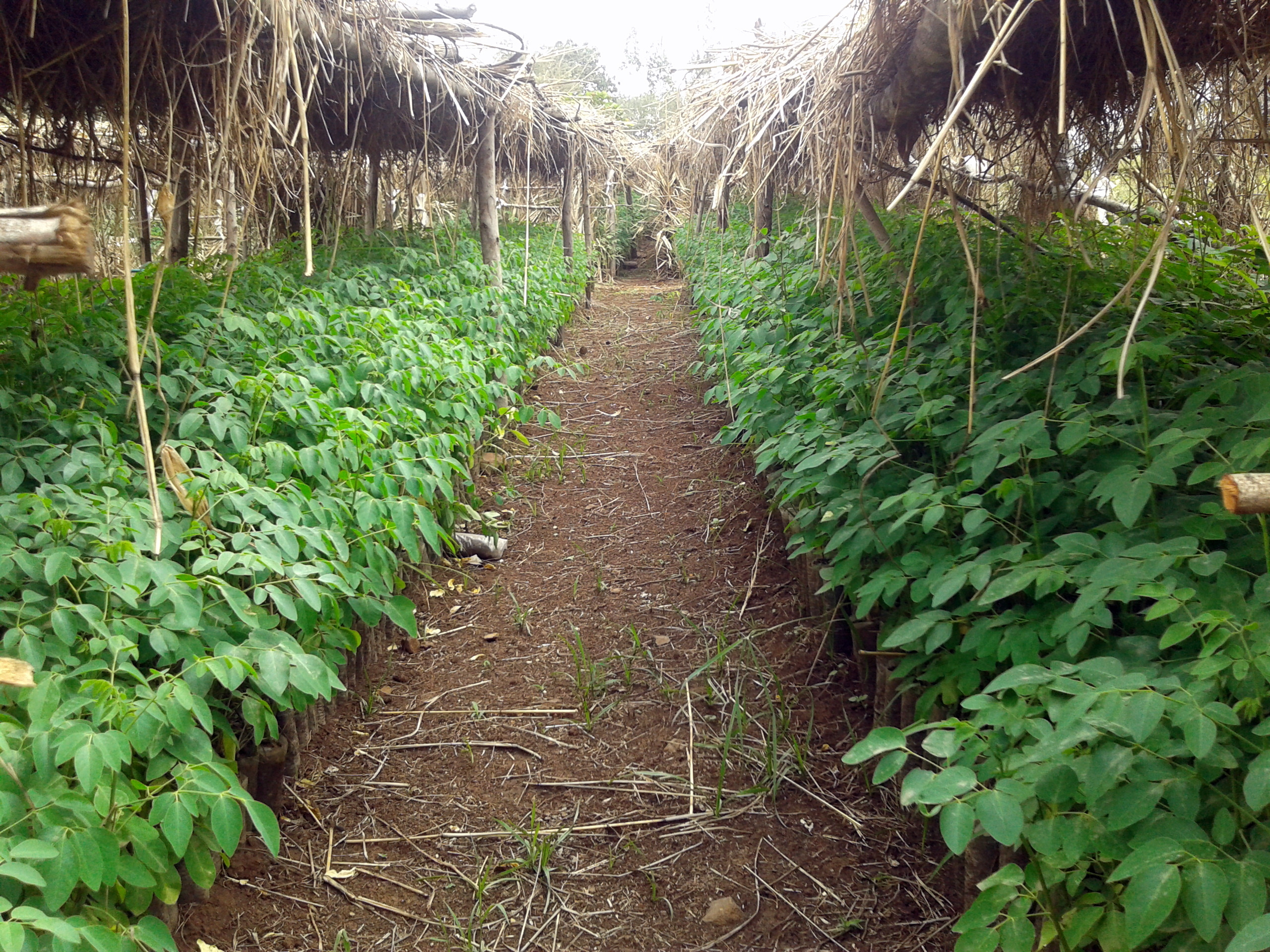
M. stenopetala nursery in the Gurage Zone of Ethiopia

It is used for shading of Capsicum and Sorghum crops, and as a companion plant. A 2015 survey across Derashe and Konso villages found that most households grow M. stenopetala trees, having done so their entire life; all had consumed the tree as food, many relied on it for income, and some used it for medicinal purposes.

Another use is the clarification and purification of water to make it potable. A powder made by grinding the seeds is found to be more effective at coagulating substances in suspension than the seeds of M. oleifera, which is used for this purpose in India. When powdered, the tree bark has adsorbent properties which may be effective in industrial wastewater treatments.

=== Folk medicine ===
M. stenopetala has a history of purported applications in folk medicine throughout its native range. The Ilchamus people of Kenya chew or boil the roots for cough relief and strength. Among the Turkana people, those with leprosy drink a decoction of the leaves. The macerated roots and/or leaves are boiled in water and taken as a herbal remedy throughout southern Ethiopia for various conditions, such as malaria, diarrhea, and dysentery. The Konso people use the dried leaves to make a tea or herbal extract, which they believe to have a soothing effect on respiratory ailments. Sap extracts from the branches and leaves may be applied externally by the Dirashe people to promote hygiene.

== Research ==
Like its sister species M. oleifera, Moringa stenopetala is under basic research to determine whether it has bioactive properties; its potential effects in humans remain unconfirmed.

== Gallery ==
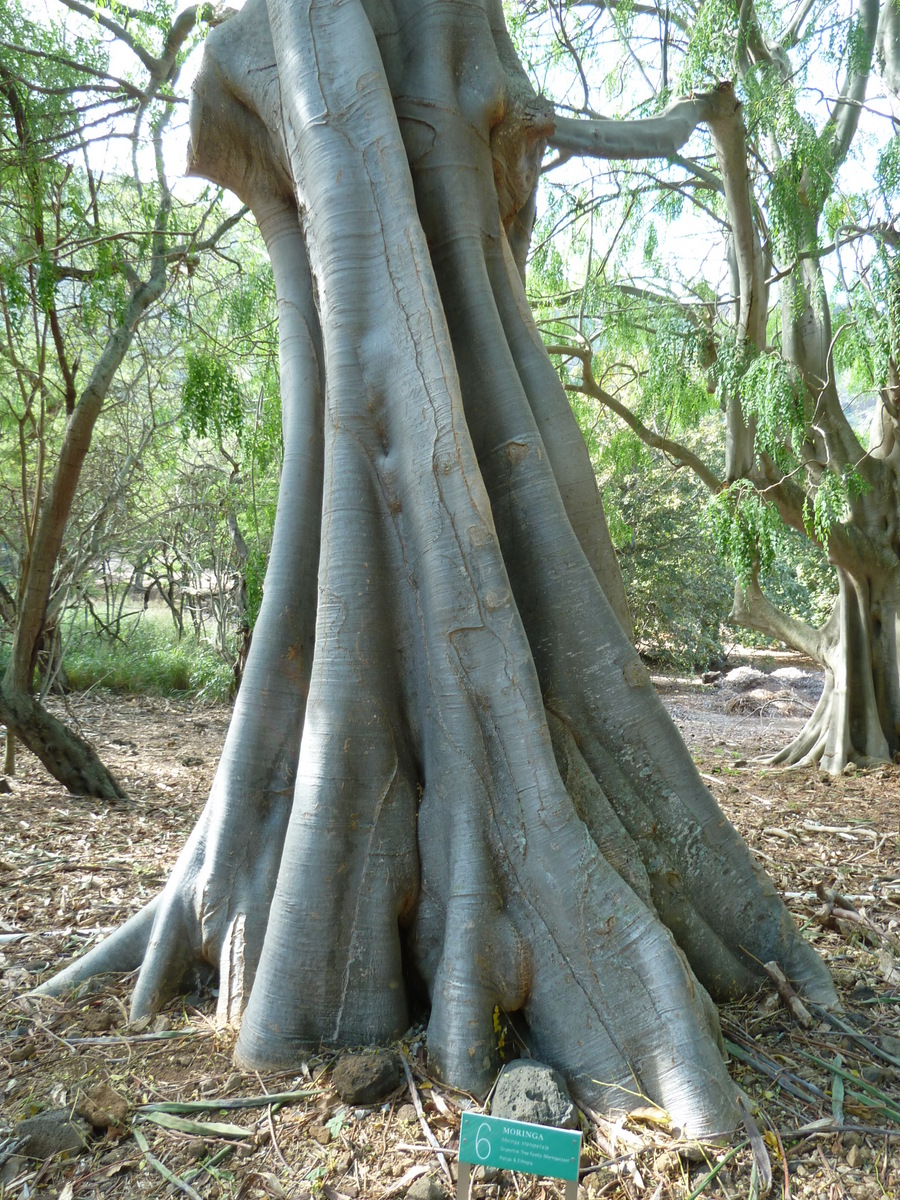
The bloated water-storing trunk of a fully grown tree at Koko Crater Botanical Garden on Oahu, Hawaii

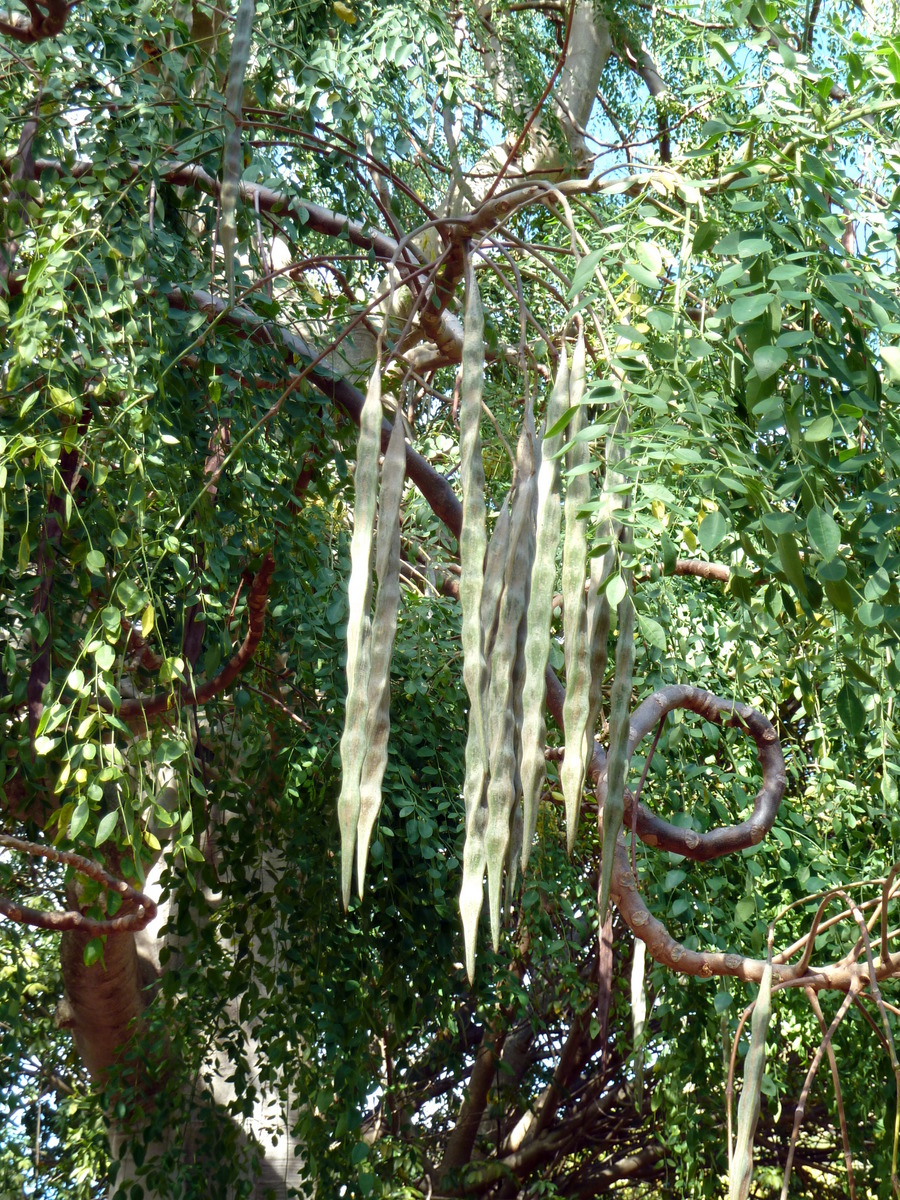
Branches with foliage and fruits at Koko Crater Botanical Garden

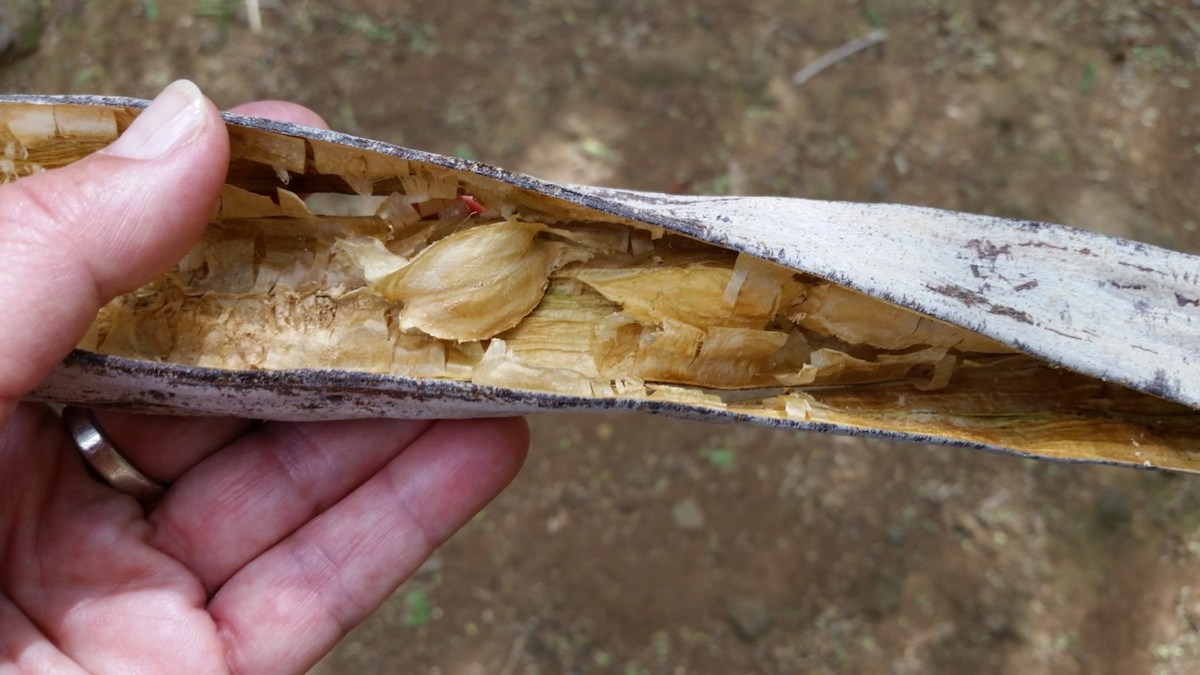
Open M. stenopetala fruit pod revealing mature seeds inside

== See also ==
Other African moringa species:

- Moringa drouhardii
- Moringa hildebrandtii
- Moringa ovalifolia
