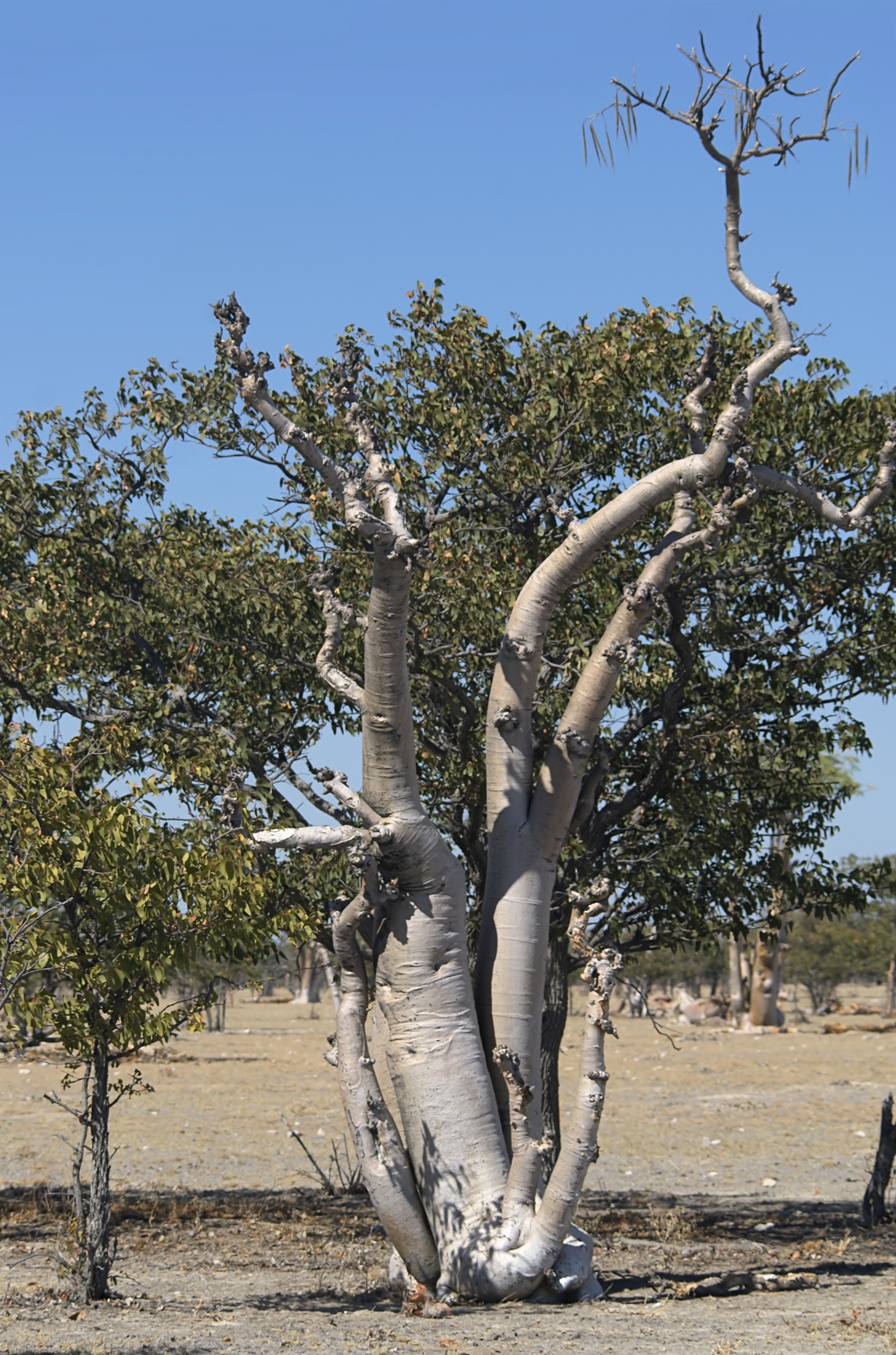
- M. ovalifolia in Namibia

Scientific classification
- Kingdom: Plantae
- Clade: Embryophytes
- Clade: Tracheophytes
- Clade: Angiosperms
- Clade: Eudicots
- Clade: Rosids
- Order: Brassicales
- Family: Moringaceae; Martinov
- Genus: Moringa; Adans.

Type species
- Moringa oleifera Lam.

Species
- See text

Synonyms
- Donaldsonia Baker f. Hyperanthera Forssk.

= Moringa (genus) =

Genus of flowering plants

Moringa is the sole genus in the plant family Moringaceae. It contains 13 species, which occur in tropical and subtropical regions of Africa and Asia and that range in size from tiny herbs to massive trees. Moringa species grow quickly in many types of environments.

The most widely cultivated species is Moringa oleifera, native to the foothills of the Himalayas in northwestern India, a multipurpose tree cultivated throughout the tropics and marketed as a dietary supplement, health food or source for herbalism practices. The fruit pods of Moringa oleifera ("drumsticks") are consumed as food in many parts of the world, particularly in South Asia. The leaves are commonly used to make tea. Oils are made from the seeds, while powders can be made from the leaves and roots.

== Description ==
Moringa is considered one of the most widely diverse genera for its size ranging from small shrubs (M. pygmaea) to large pachycaul trees (M. ovalifolia).

=== Growth habit ===
Moringa contains a wide range of growth habits that may be subdivided into the following categories:

- Bottle (pachycaul) trees: M. drouhardii, M. hildebrandtii, M. ovalifolia, M. stenopetala
- Slender trees: M. concanensis, M. oleifera, M. peregrina
- Sarcorhizal trees: M. arborea, M. ruspoliana
- Tuberous shrubs: M. borziana, M. longituba, M. pygmaea, M. rivae

=== Leaves ===
Leaves are typically pinnately compound with entire margins.

=== Flowers ===
Flowers may be either bilaterally or radially symmetric. Bottle trees typically produce small, radially symmetric flowers, while other members of the genus produce radially symmetric flowers. Most flowers range in color from white to cream to brown with the notable exception of M. longituba which produces bright red flowers.

=== Fruit ===
Fruits are typically elongated, slender, 3-valved "pods" resembling an indehiscent silique (in contrast with a true dehiscent silique). Fruits of M. oleifera (drumstick), are a major agricultural product of India, eaten as a vegetable and used for traditional medicine.

=== Phytochemistry ===
Moringa contain a number of sulfurous biochemical compounds called "mustard-oil glycosides" or glucosinolates commonly found in cruciferous vegetables of Brassicaceae. Benzyl glucosinolate along with family-specific glucomoringin and glucosoonjnain have been detected from various Moringa species and are thought to be the cause of the bitter taste in some Moringa leaves.

== Taxonomy ==
=== Higher-level classification ===
The monotypic family, Moringaceae, containing genus Moringa has been placed in the order Brassicales according to most modern taxonomic systems, including the APG IV system. Molecular data has suggested a close relationship between Moringaceae and Caricaceae with many identifying a "Caricaceae-Moringaceae" clade within Brassicales. Prior to the availability of molecular data, morphological classification of Moringaceae placed the family in either Brassicales or Sapindales due to the unusual morphological diversity of the family.

=== Classification within the genus ===
Moringa contains three widely recognized clades—Donaldsonia, Moringa, and Dysmoringa. Donaldsonia, once thought to be a subgenus of Moringa, is a non-monophyletic clade identifiable by radially symmetric flowers and containing the bottle trees M. drouhardii, M. hildebrandtii, M. ovalifolia, and M. stenopetala. The Moringa clade contains all other members of genus Moringa (except M. longituba) characterized by irregular floral symmetry, perigynous flowers, and short receptacles. The Dysmoringa clade contains the species M. longituba which diverges from common Moringa clade characteristics due to its long receptacle and red flowers. The exact phylogenetic relationship between members of Moringa continues to evolve with growing molecular data, though the Donaldsonia clade is consistently identified as the basalmost clade within the family.

== List of species ==
- Moringa arborea Verdc. (indigenous to Kenya)
- Moringa borziana Mattei (indigenous to Somalia)
- Moringa concanensis Nimmo (indigenous to northern India)
- Moringa drouhardii Jum. – bottle tree (indigenous to southwestern Madagascar)
- Moringa hildebrandtii Engl. – Hildebrandt's moringa (indigenous to southwestern Madagascar)
- Moringa longituba Engl. (indigenous to Ethiopia and Somalia)
- Moringa oleifera Lam. (syn. M. pterygosperma) – horseradish tree (indigenous to northwestern India)
- Moringa ovalifolia Dinter & Berger (indigenous to Namibia and Angola)
- Moringa peregrina (Forssk.) Fiori indigenous to Arabian Peninsula Horn of Africa and in the Southern Sinai, Egypt
- Moringa pygmaea Verdc. (indigenous to Somalia)
- Moringa rivae Chiov. (indigenous to Kenya and Ethiopia)
- Moringa ruspoliana Engl. (indigenous to Ethiopia)
- Moringa stenopetala (Baker f.) Cufod. (indigenous to Kenya and Ethiopia)

== Gallery ==
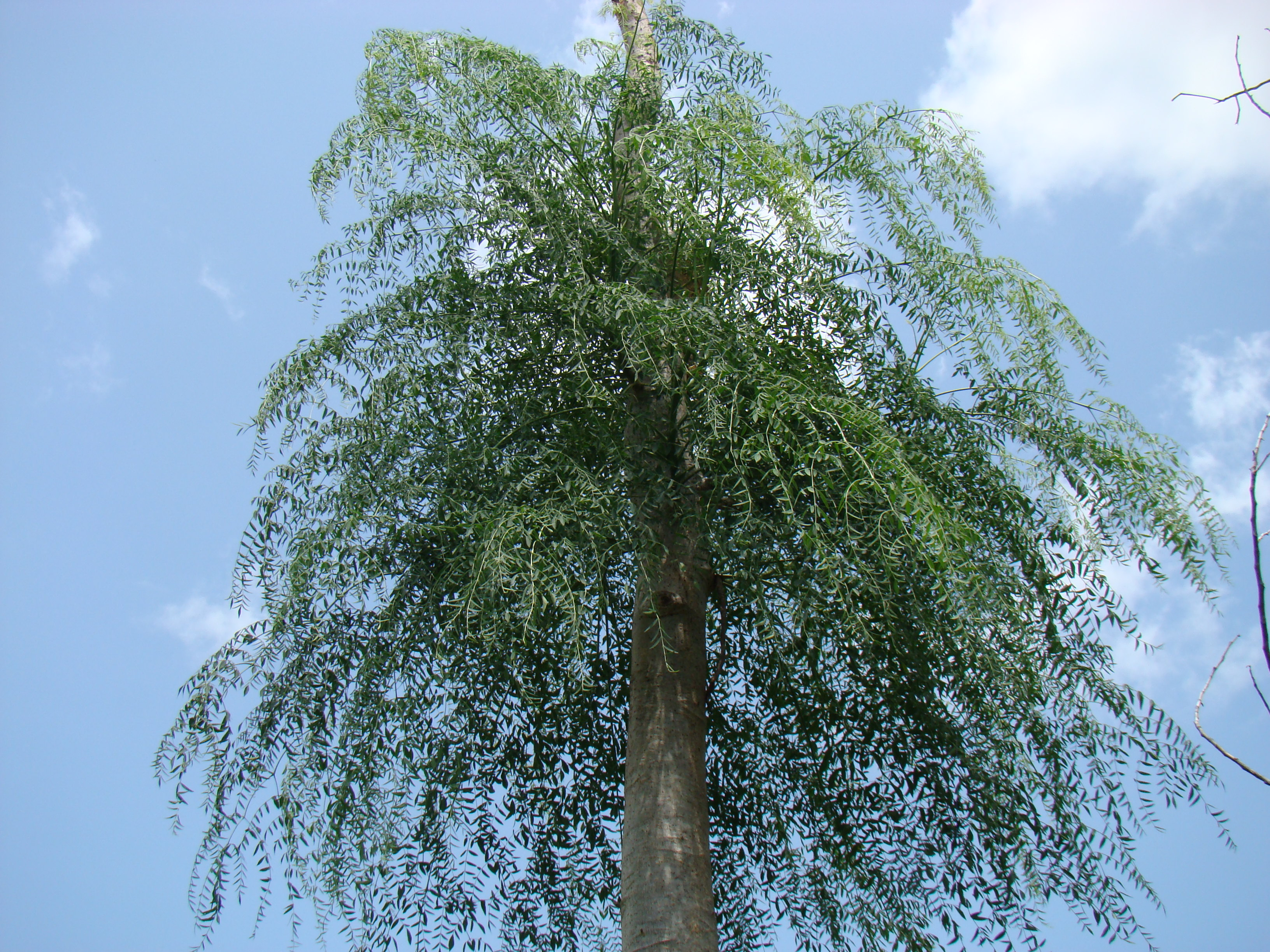
Moringa drouhardii (Bottle tree)

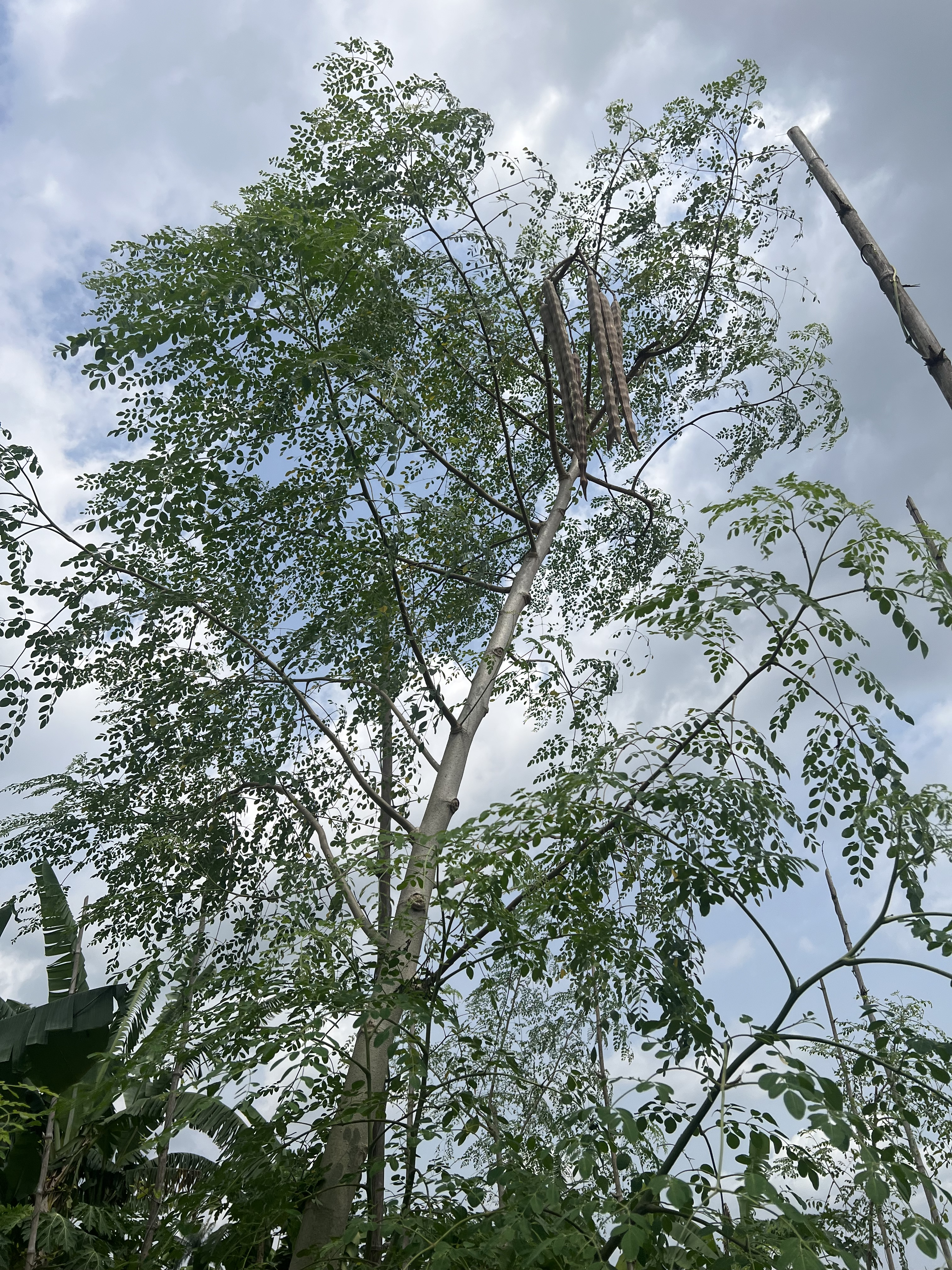
Moringa oleifera (Drumstick tree)

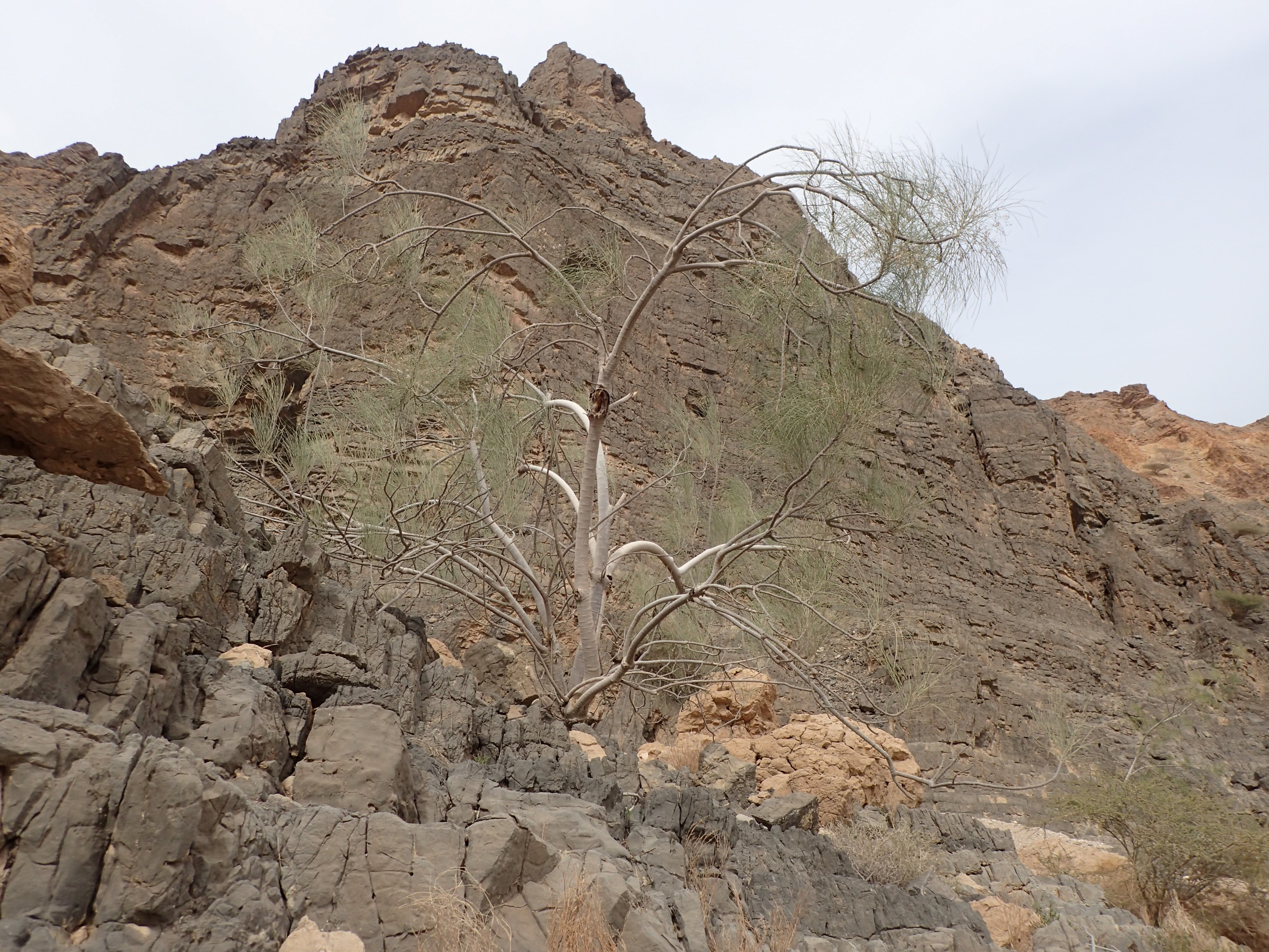
Moringa peregrina (Arabian moringa)

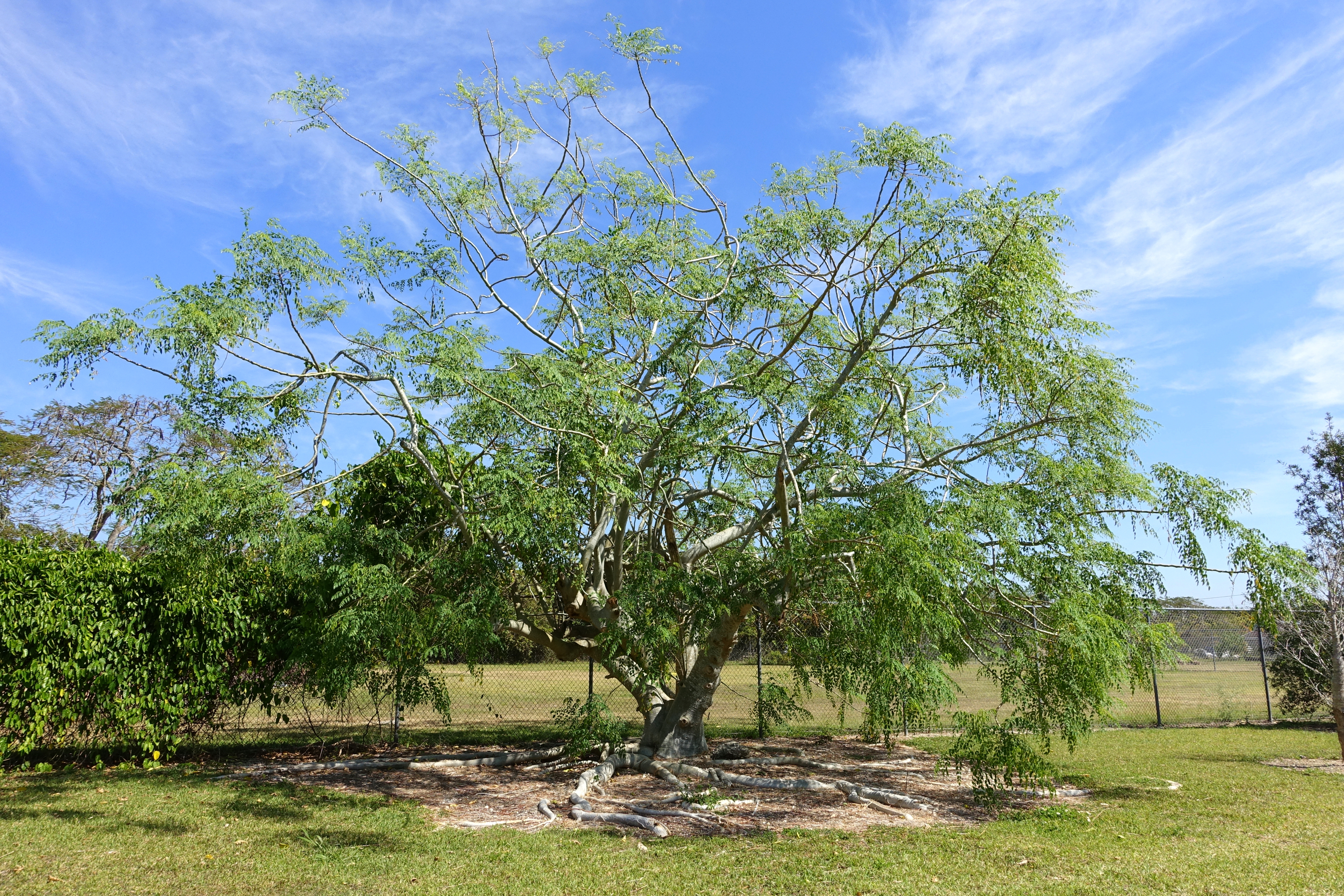
Moringa stenopetala (Cabbage tree)

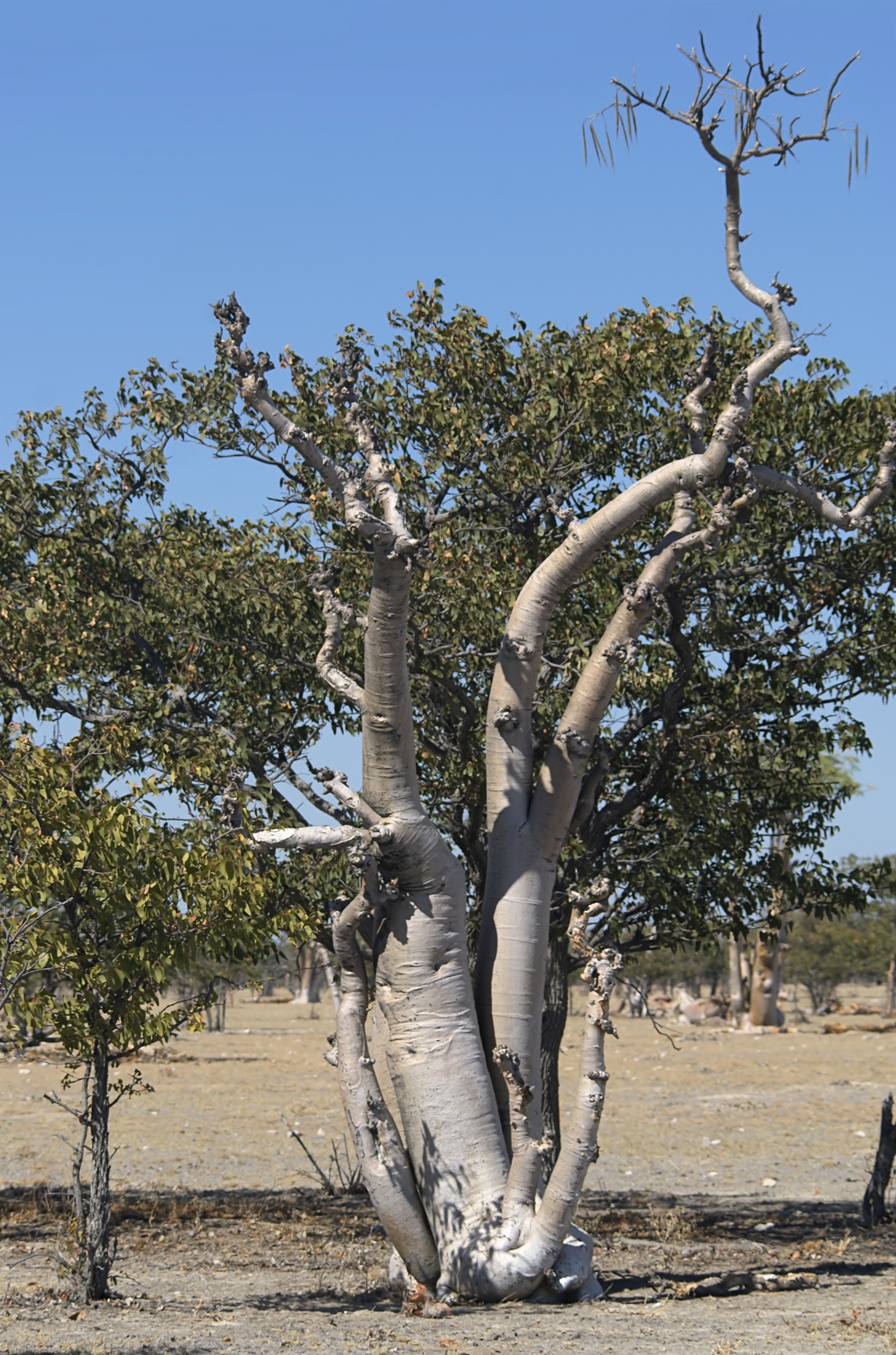
Moringa ovalifolia (Namibian moringa)

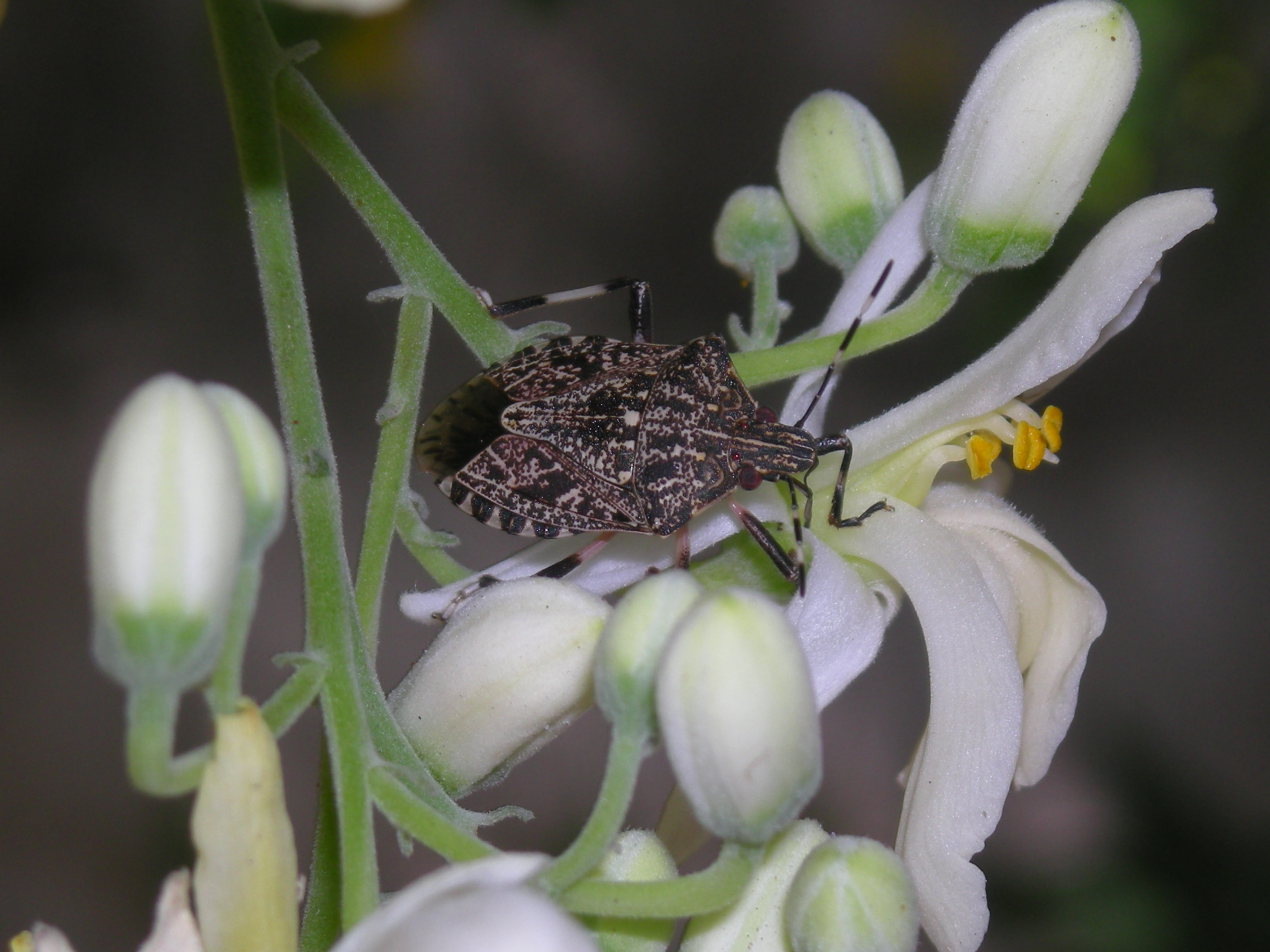
Moringa arborea (Ethiopian moringa)

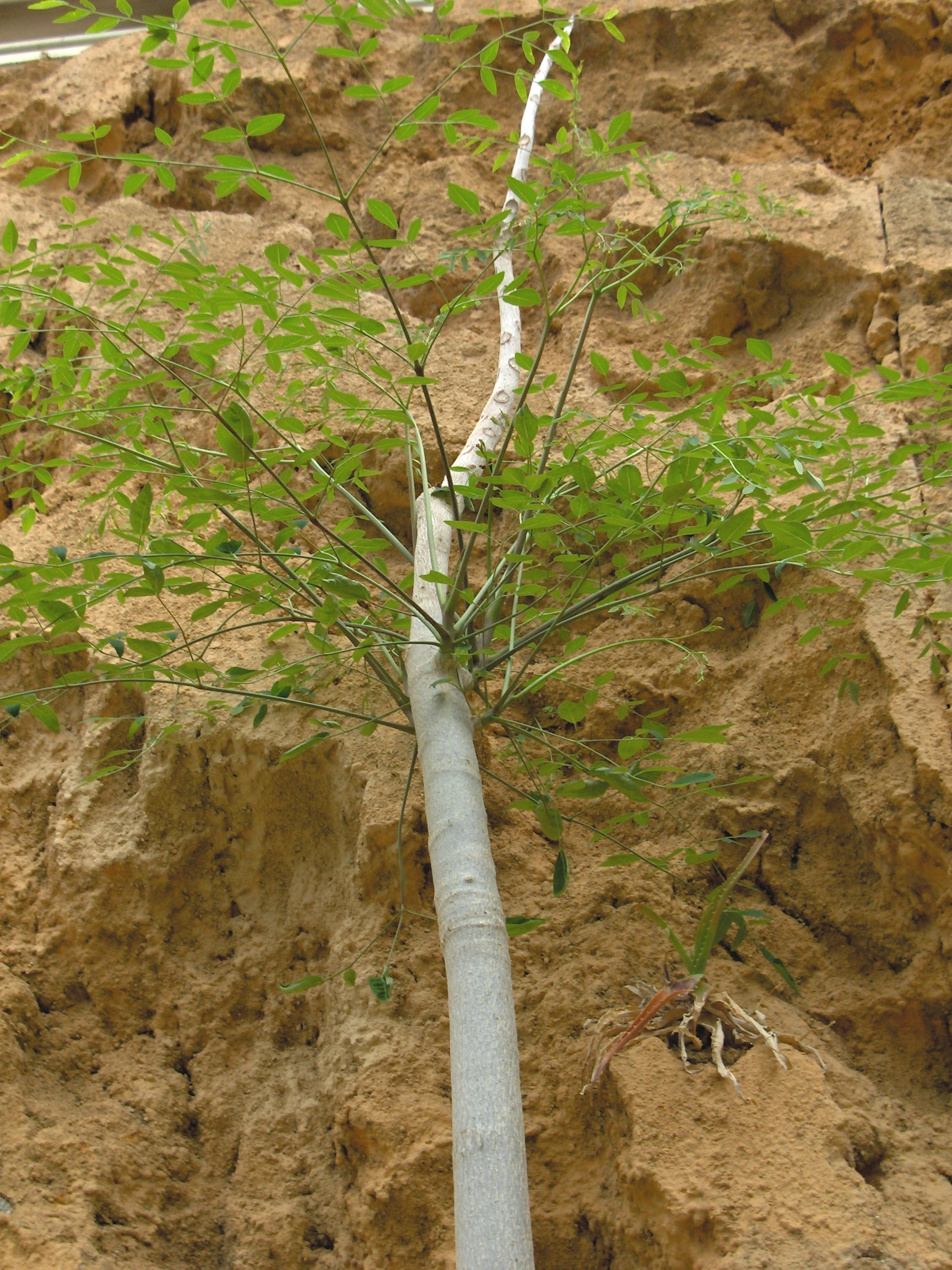
Moringa hildebrandtii (Hildebrandt's moringa)

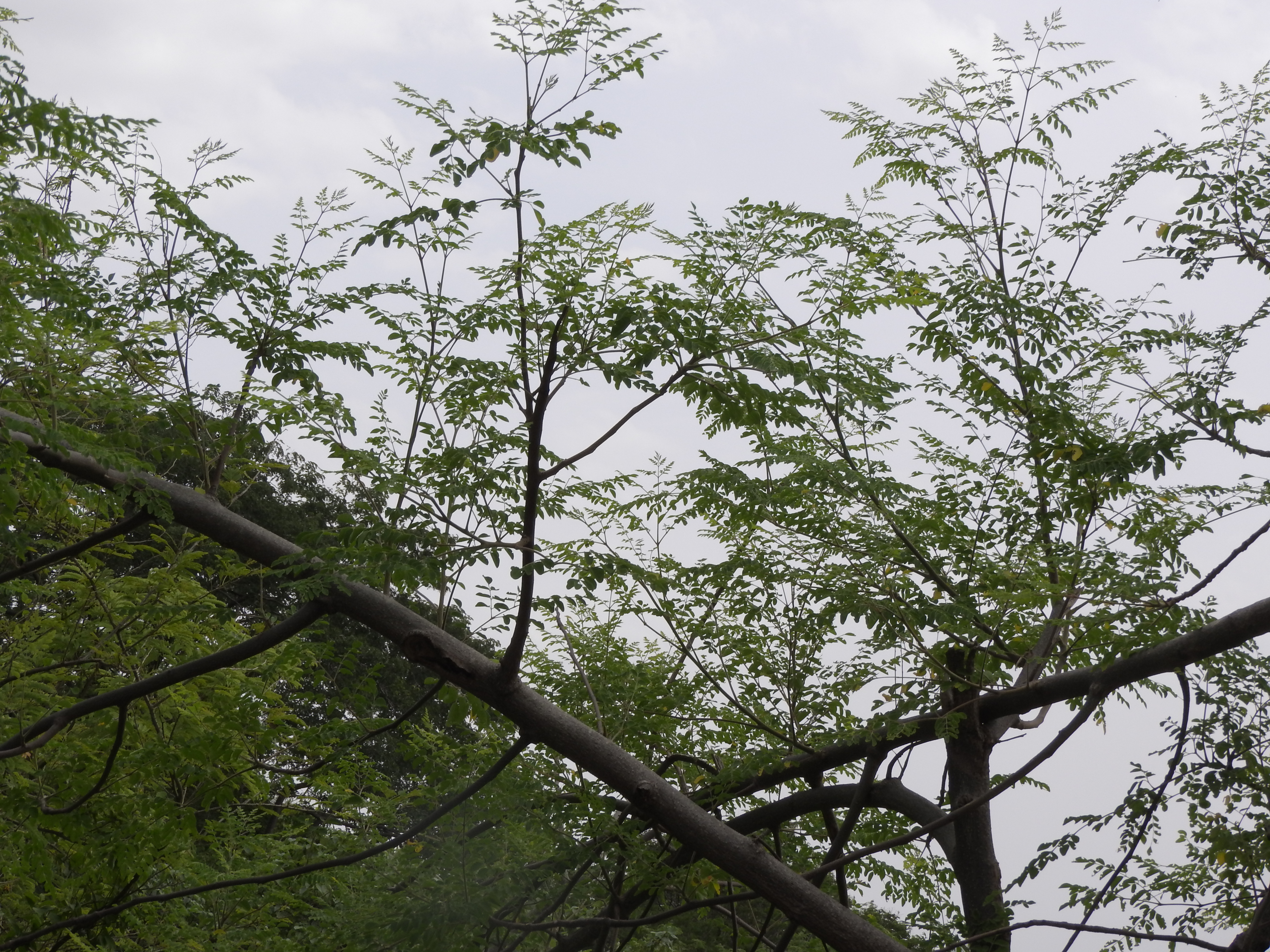
Moringa concanensis (Ghat moringa)
