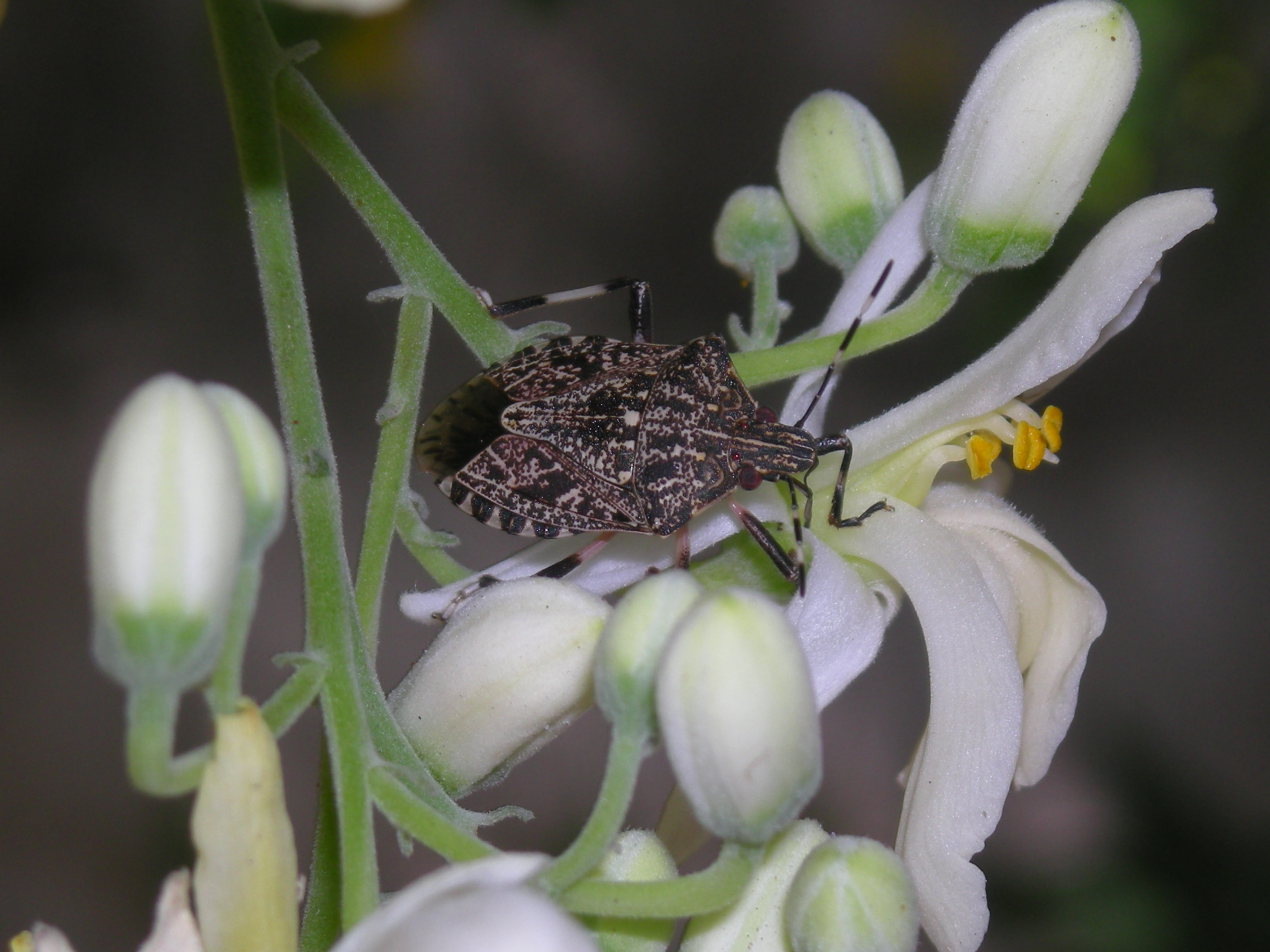
- Flower of Moringa arborea (includes stink bug)

Conservation status
- Data Deficient (IUCN 3.1)

Scientific classification
- Kingdom: Plantae
- Clade: Tracheophytes
- Clade: Angiosperms
- Clade: Eudicots
- Clade: Rosids
- Order: Brassicales
- Family: Moringaceae
- Genus: Moringa
- Species: M. arborea

Binomial name
- Moringa arborea Verdc.

= Moringa arborea =

Species of tree

Moringa arborea is a species of flowering plant in the family Moringaceae that is native to Ethiopia and Kenya.
