= Fairy Tale Forest (Etosha) =

Section of Etosha National Park, Namibia

The Fairy Tale Forest (Afrikaans: sprokieswoud) is situated in the Etosha National Park in the Kunene Region, Namibia, near Grünewald Farm. It is an open forest of Moringa ovalifolia ("Fairy tale trees").

The largest concentration of Moringa ovalifolia in the world, the forest is 2 km x 2 km in size and is located on a limestone plain covered with sweetgrass. The park's trees have often been damaged by elephant herds in the past, but are now protected from them.

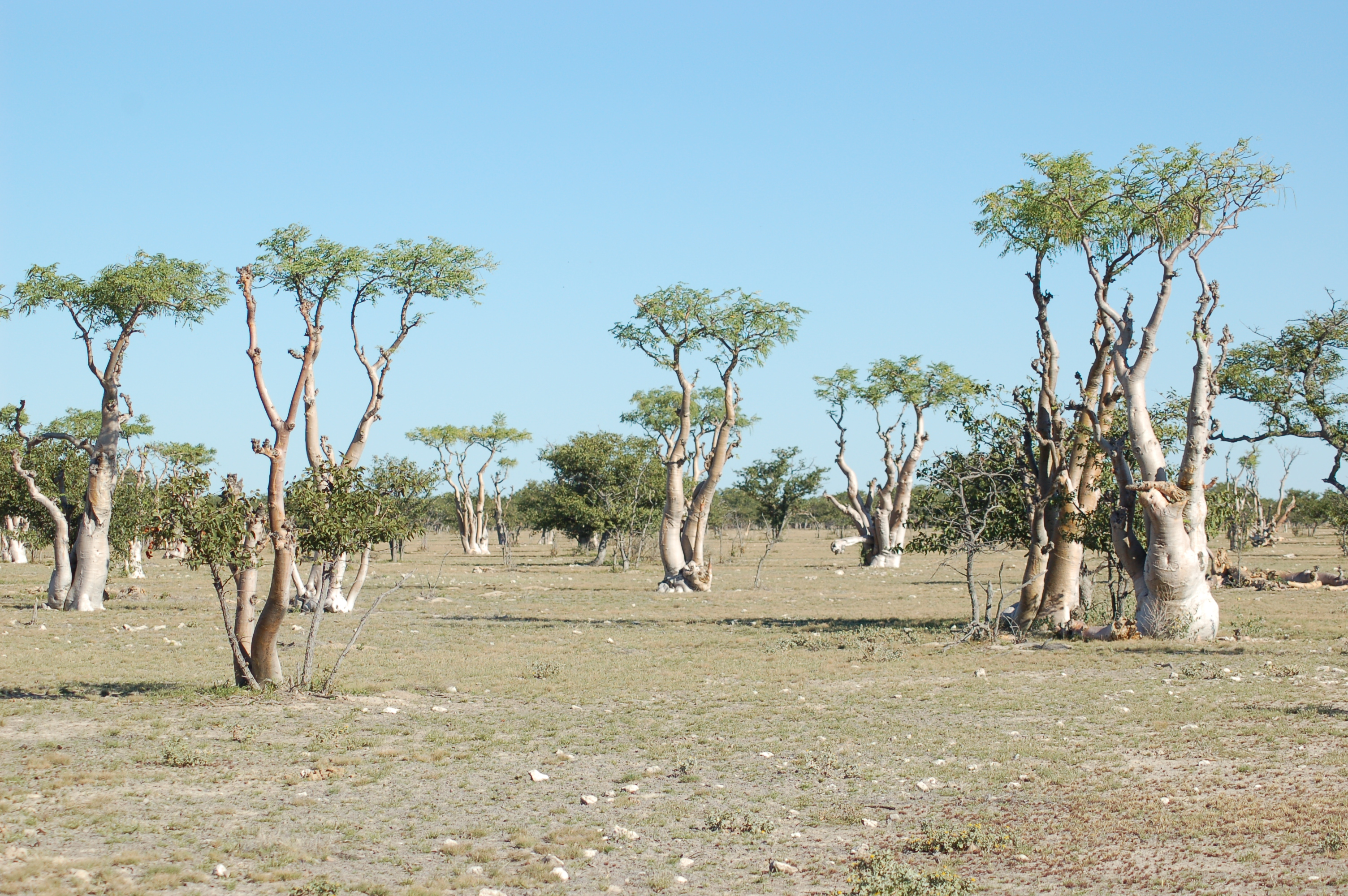
The forest in the summer

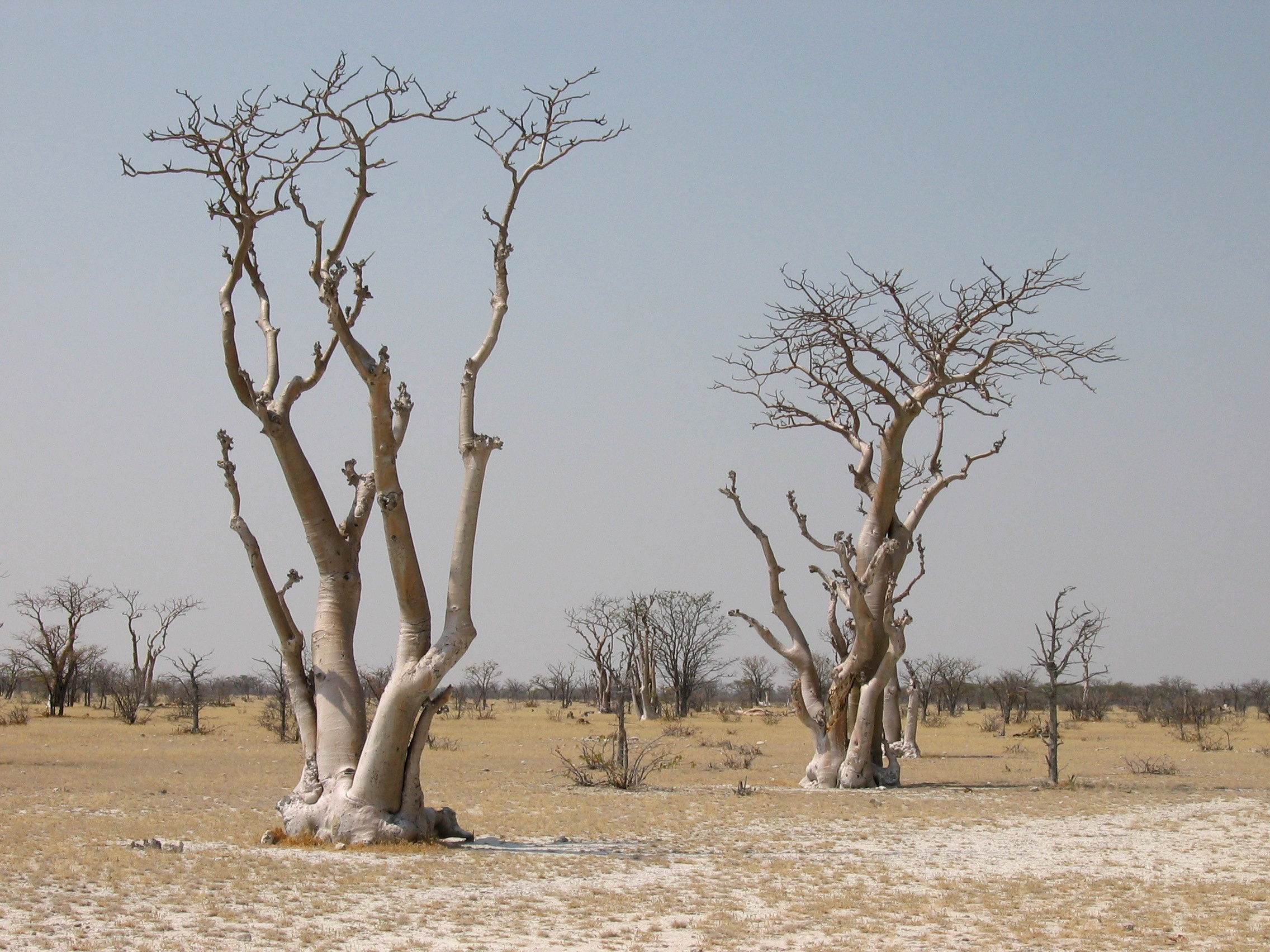
The forest in the winter
