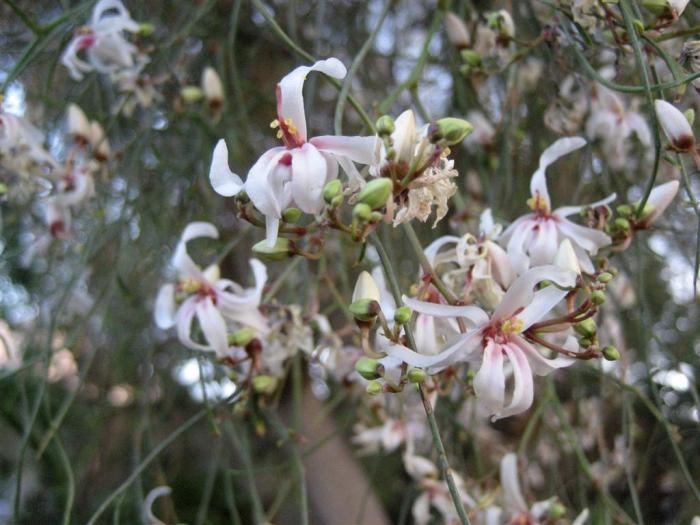

Conservation status
- Least Concern (IUCN 3.1)

Scientific classification
- Kingdom: Plantae
- Clade: Tracheophytes
- Clade: Angiosperms
- Clade: Eudicots
- Clade: Rosids
- Order: Brassicales
- Family: Moringaceae
- Genus: Moringa
- Species: M. peregrina

Binomial name
- Moringa peregrina (Forssk.) Fiori

Synonyms
- Gymnocladus arabica Lam.; Hyperanthera aptera (Gaertn.) Steud.; Hyperanthera arborea J.F.Gmel.; Hyperanthera monodynama Vilm.; Hyperanthera peregrina Forssk.; Hyperanthera semidecandra Vahl; Moringa aptera Gaertn.; Moringa arabica (Lam.) Pers.; Moringa myrepsica Thell.

= Moringa peregrina =

Species of plant

Moringa peregrina is a species of flowering plant in the family Moringaceae that is native to the Horn of Africa, Sudan, Egypt, the Arabian Peninsula, and as far north as Syria. It grows on rocky wadis and on cliffs in drier areas.

== Description ==
Moringa peregrina is a small deciduous tree, 6-10 m tall, with large leaves and thin pendulous branches. The tree blossoms twice a year; in Spring and in Autumn. Its flowers are five petaled, white or streaked red or pink. Its fruits are distinctive and can be seen hanging from its branches throughout the year. The fruits are narrowly cylindrical, up to 30 cm long and marked with deep longitudinal grooves. When ripe they split into three valves shedding the large whitish seed, known as the behen-nut.

== Range and habitat ==
Moringa peregrina ranges across northeastern Africa and southwestern Asia. In Africa it is found in Egypt, Sudan, and the countries of the Horn of Africa – Eritrea, Ethiopia, Djibouti, Somalia and also in Libya. It occurs further across the Arabian Peninsula, and in Israel, Jordan, Palestine, and Syria. It has an estimated extent of occurrence (EOO) of over 5,791,000 km^{2}.

It grows on the rocky slopes of wadis and gullies and in Acacia–Commiphora woodland.

In Israel, the tree is protected by law and grows along rugged, desert rock-faces and canyons along the Dead Sea, especially where there are watercourses, such as in Ein Gedi and in Naḥal Gob (near the lower Naḥal Sīn), as well as near the springs of al-Ḥama at the entrance to Wadi Qelt.

== Uses ==
Moringa peregrina has traditionally been used for home construction and fires, and its leaves consumed as food and livestock feed. In eastern Oman, young Moringa peregrina saplings would be dug up and their roots slowly roasted in a fire for food. In Oman, oil extracted from pods was used in traditional medicine and in perfumery.

The seed contains a fragranced light oil, having the unusual and valuable quality that it does not grow rancid. In the Middle Ages, it was used as a base oil for certain perfumes.

Bedouins in Egypt would supply the Cairo market with behen-nut seeds, from which a fine, lubricant oil was extracted for use in mechanical watches. The manner in which the Bedouins extracted the oil from the behen-nut for their own personal use in cooking was marked with superstitious practices. After collecting the seeds from the pods, they would boil the seeds in water, and when the oil surfaced, it was skimmed off. The fire that they used for this process was made from yasaar wood (Moringa peregrina) only. The person or persons doing the extracting were always alone, as they believed that if they were being watched, the yield obtained from the seeds would be far less in quantity, or none at all.

A high quality behen oil was produced from the seeds of Moringa peregrina growing in Saudi Arabia (the Hijaz) and in Yemen. The best seeds were those whose peel inclined to be blackish in color, while the white seed would cause frothing on the surface of the liquid when it is cooked.

Bedouins have traditionally made use of the solidified resin extracted from the seeds to rosin the strings of the Arab violin (rebābah).

=== Method of extraction ===
A primitive method of extraction of the Moringa oil (behen oil, also Ben nut oil) is described in the writings of Al-Nuwayri, who cites the Arab physician, Al-Tamimi. The seeds, he says, were taken from the pods and ground in a special quern or millstone made for the purpose. Afterwards, the ground pulp was placed inside a large brass-copper cauldron that held a capacity of a little over 19 Syrian kiljah, equivalent to about 120 litres (130 US qt), the cauldron being filled to 2/3 of its capacity. Water was then poured over the ground pulp so that it completely covered it, with an excess of 4 fingerbreadths of water. The cauldron was stoked from beneath with thick logs of wood, and the water and pulp brought to a boil. In this state, the ground behen-nut seeds were allowed to cook for a half-day, while all evaporated water was being restored to the cauldron by degrees. After a half-day of cooking, the cauldron was removed from the fire and allowed to cool down. The oil which then floated on the surface of the water was scooped out and stored in a prepared vessel.
