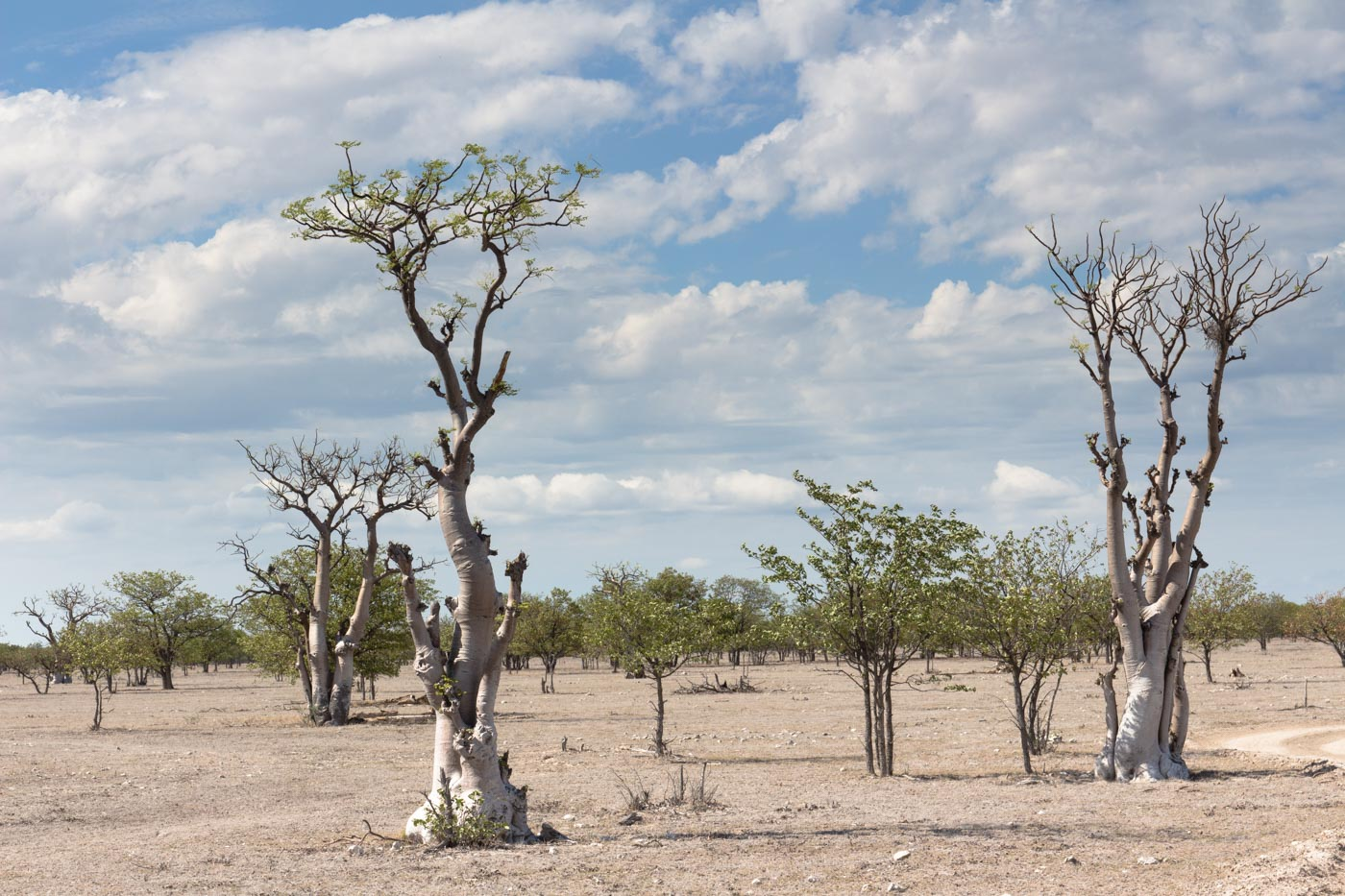

Scientific classification
- Kingdom: Plantae
- Clade: Embryophytes
- Clade: Tracheophytes
- Clade: Angiosperms
- Clade: Eudicots
- Clade: Rosids
- Order: Brassicales
- Family: Moringaceae
- Genus: Moringa
- Species: M. ovalifolia

Binomial name
- Moringa ovalifolia Dinter & A.Berger

Synonyms
- Moringa pterygosperma Gaertn. Moringa ovalifoliolata Dinter & A.Berger

= Moringa ovalifolia =

Species of tree

Moringa ovalifolia is a succulent flowering tree of the family Moringaceae native to Namibia and southwestern Angola.

It is a succulent-stemmed tree found in desert and semi-desert areas. The plant grows vertically, and can reach 7 m (23 ft) in height. It is deciduous and has a main branch up to 1 meter in diameter.

German botanists Kurt Dinter and Alwin Berger described the species in 1914.

Moringa ovalifolia has been classified in a section Donaldsoniana within the genus, however genetic analysis shows that this group is not a natural group (paraphyletic).

Moringa ovalifolia occurs on rocky escarpment passes leading to the Namib Desert. This species is the dominant component of the woodland known as the Fairy Tale Forest in Etosha National Park.

== Gallery ==
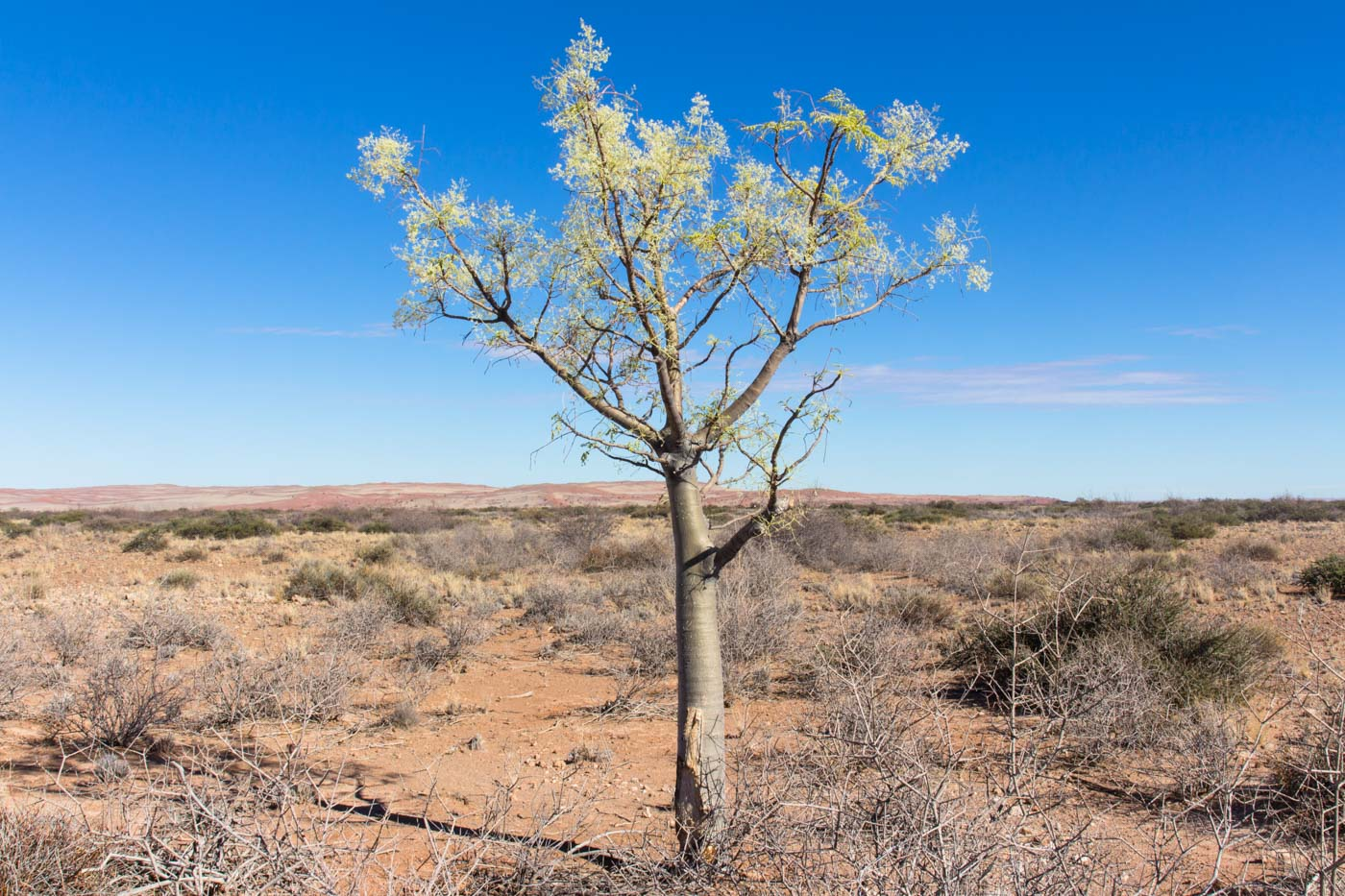

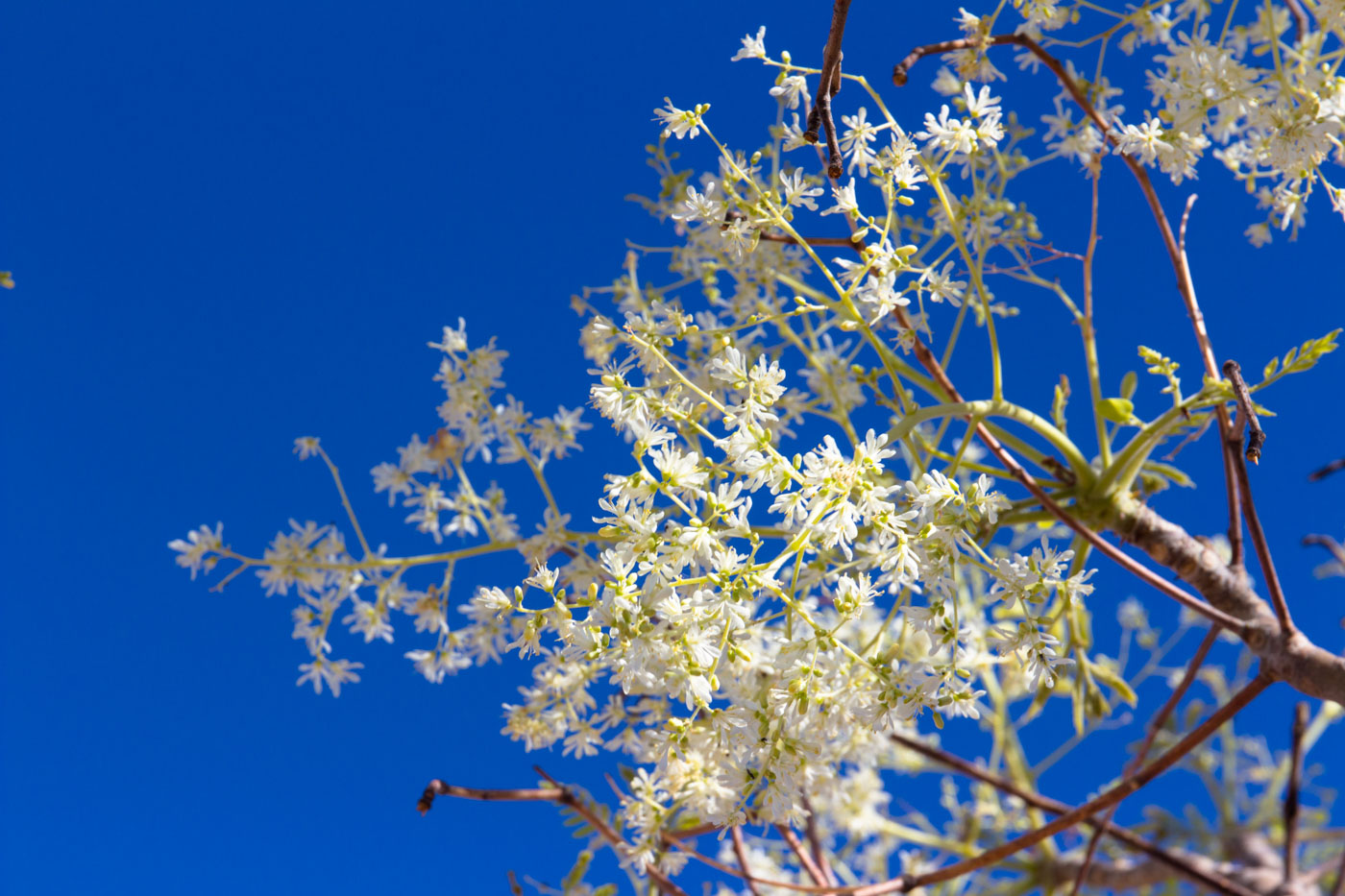

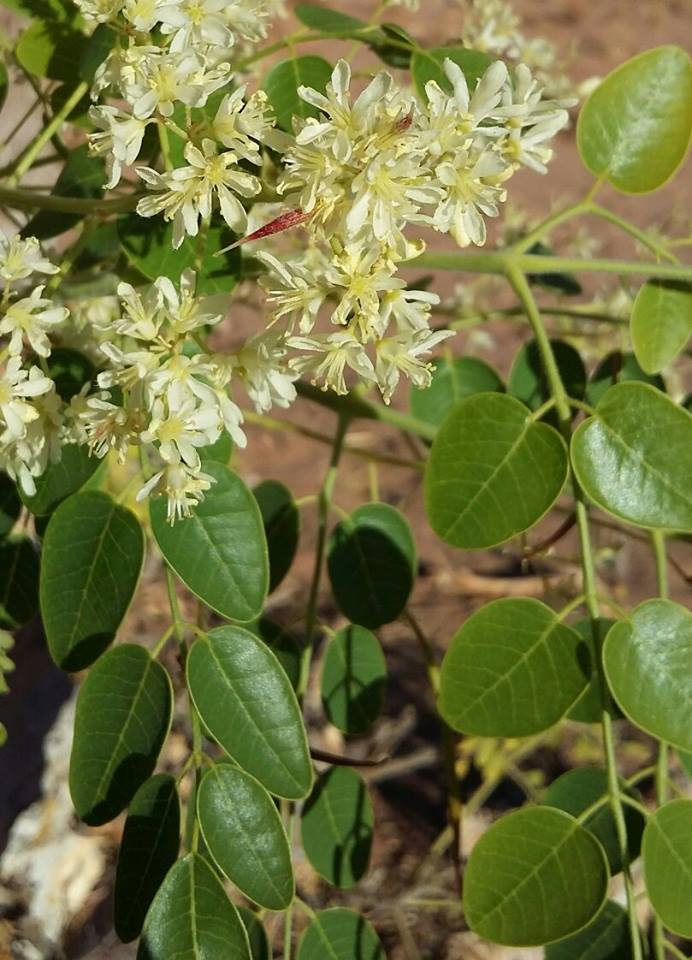

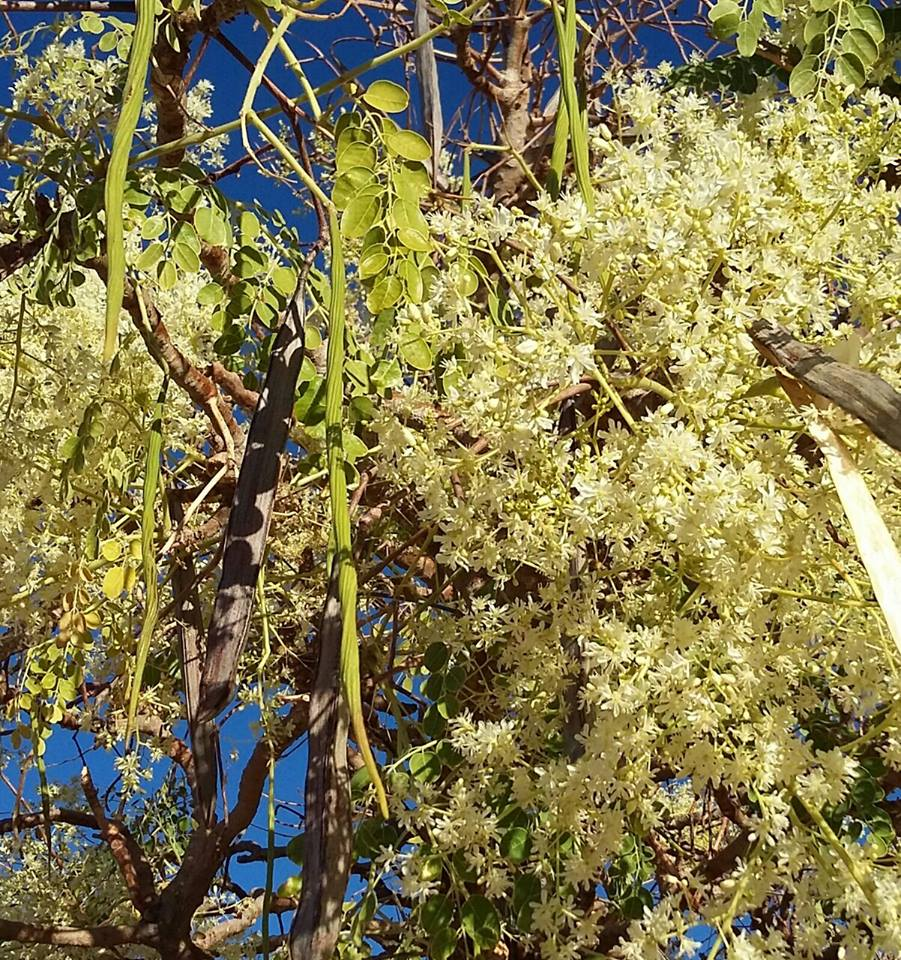
