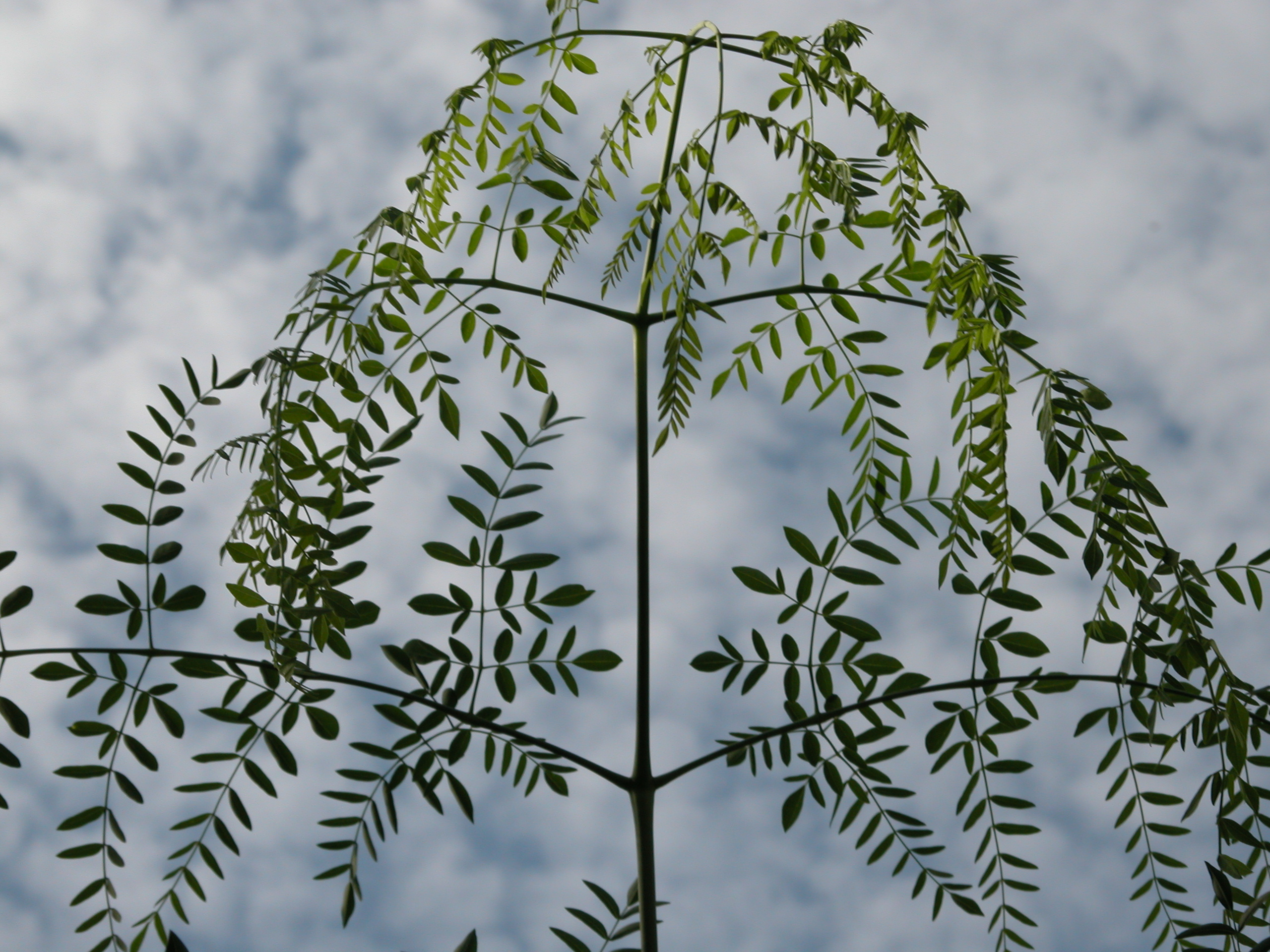

Scientific classification
- Kingdom: Plantae
- Clade: Tracheophytes
- Clade: Angiosperms
- Clade: Eudicots
- Clade: Rosids
- Order: Brassicales
- Family: Moringaceae
- Genus: Moringa
- Species: M. drouhardii

Binomial name
- Moringa drouhardii Jum.

= Moringa drouhardii =

Species of tree

Moringa drouhardii, the bottle tree or maroseranana, is an endemic species of southwest Madagascar. It occurs in the Madagascar spiny thickets ecoregion, especially at the limestone cliffs to the east of Lake Tsimanampetsotsa, on the Mahafaly Plateau. The species is often planted in local villages and around traditional tombs. Neither the seeds (rich in edible oil and flocculating proteins) nor the leaves (that can be eaten as green vegetables) are traditionally used in the Atsimo-Andrefana Region (southwestern Madagascar) despite their significant benefits.

== Gallery ==
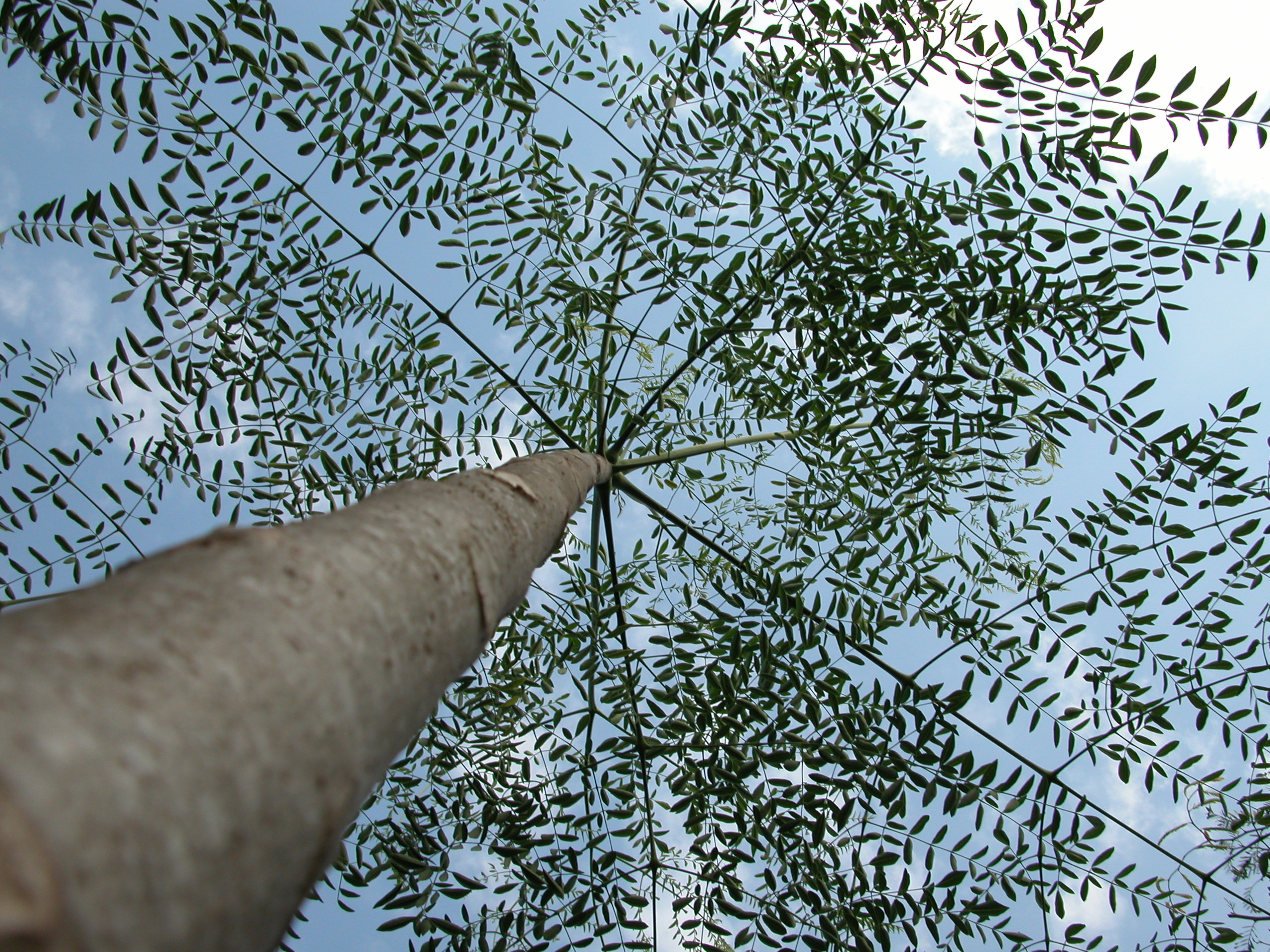
19 May 2007

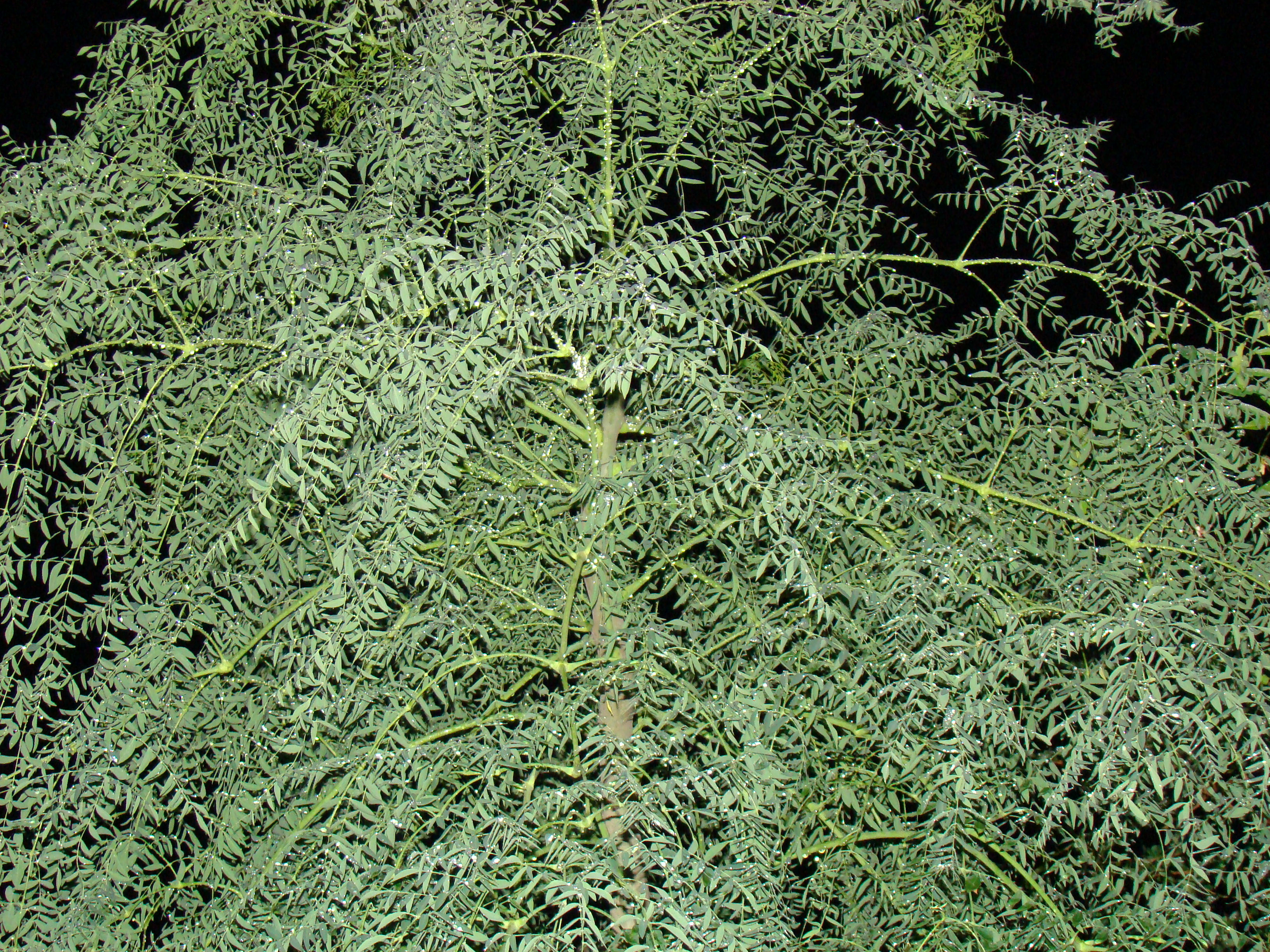
19 September 2007

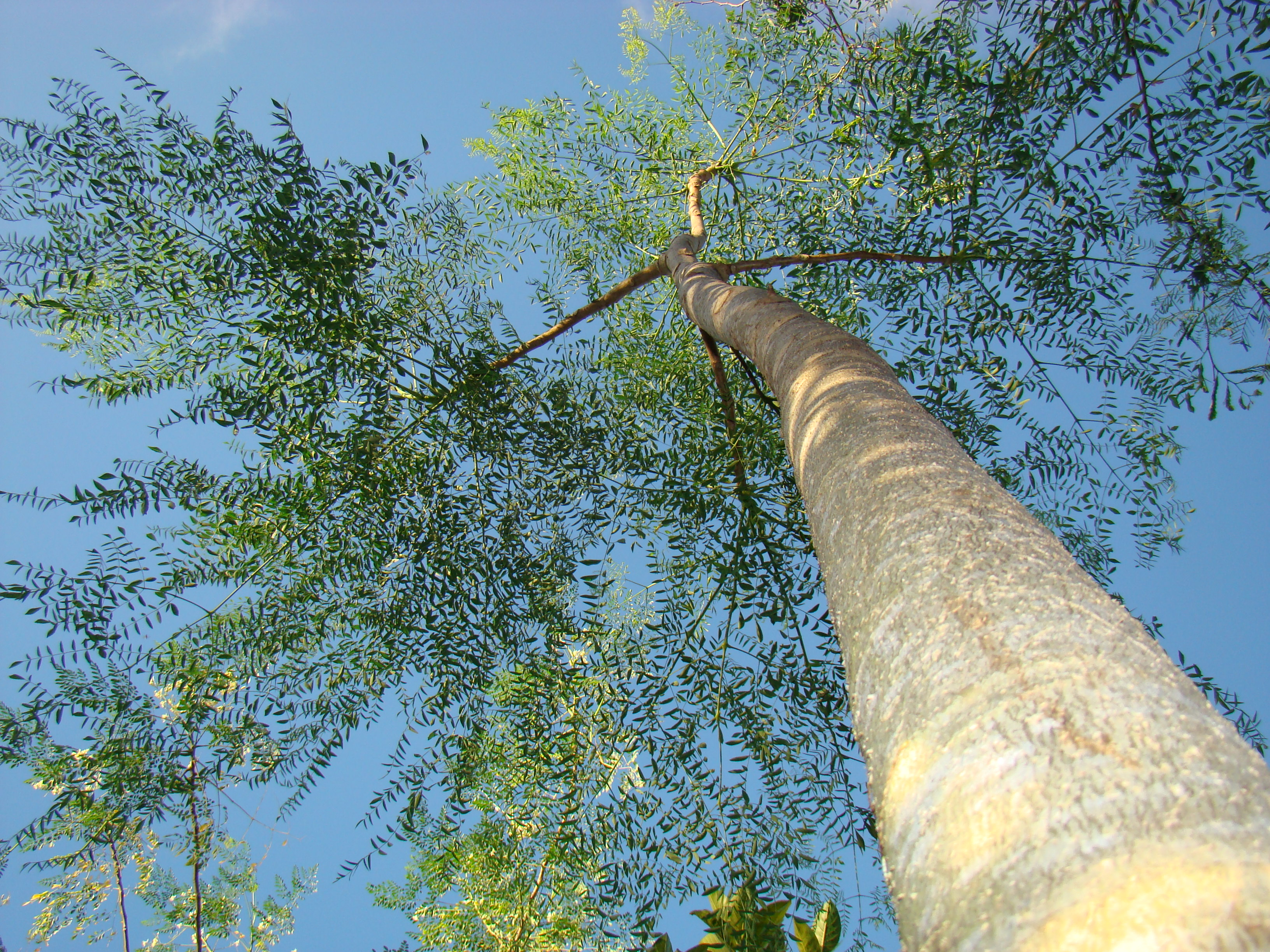
6 June 2008

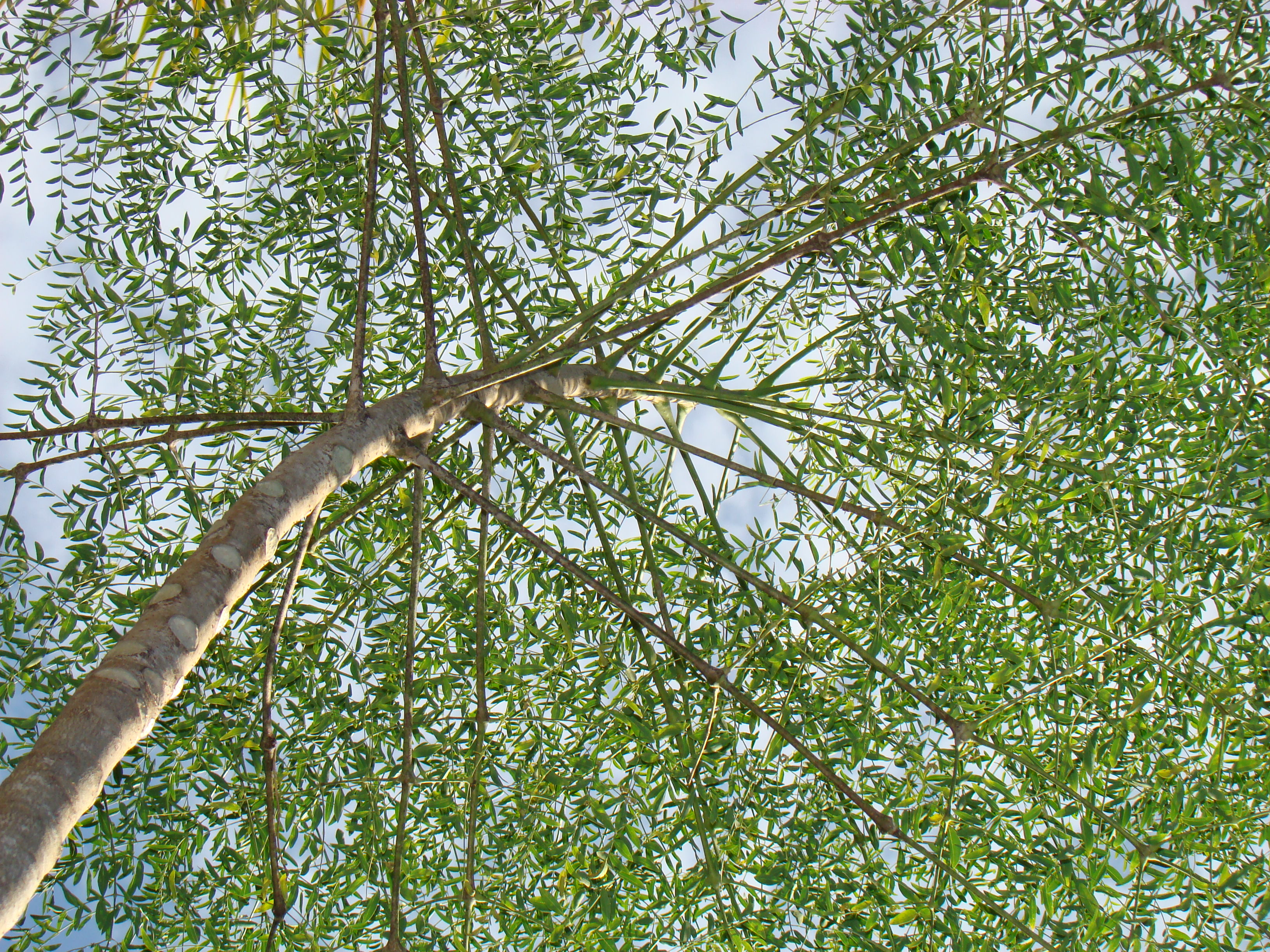
28 November 2009

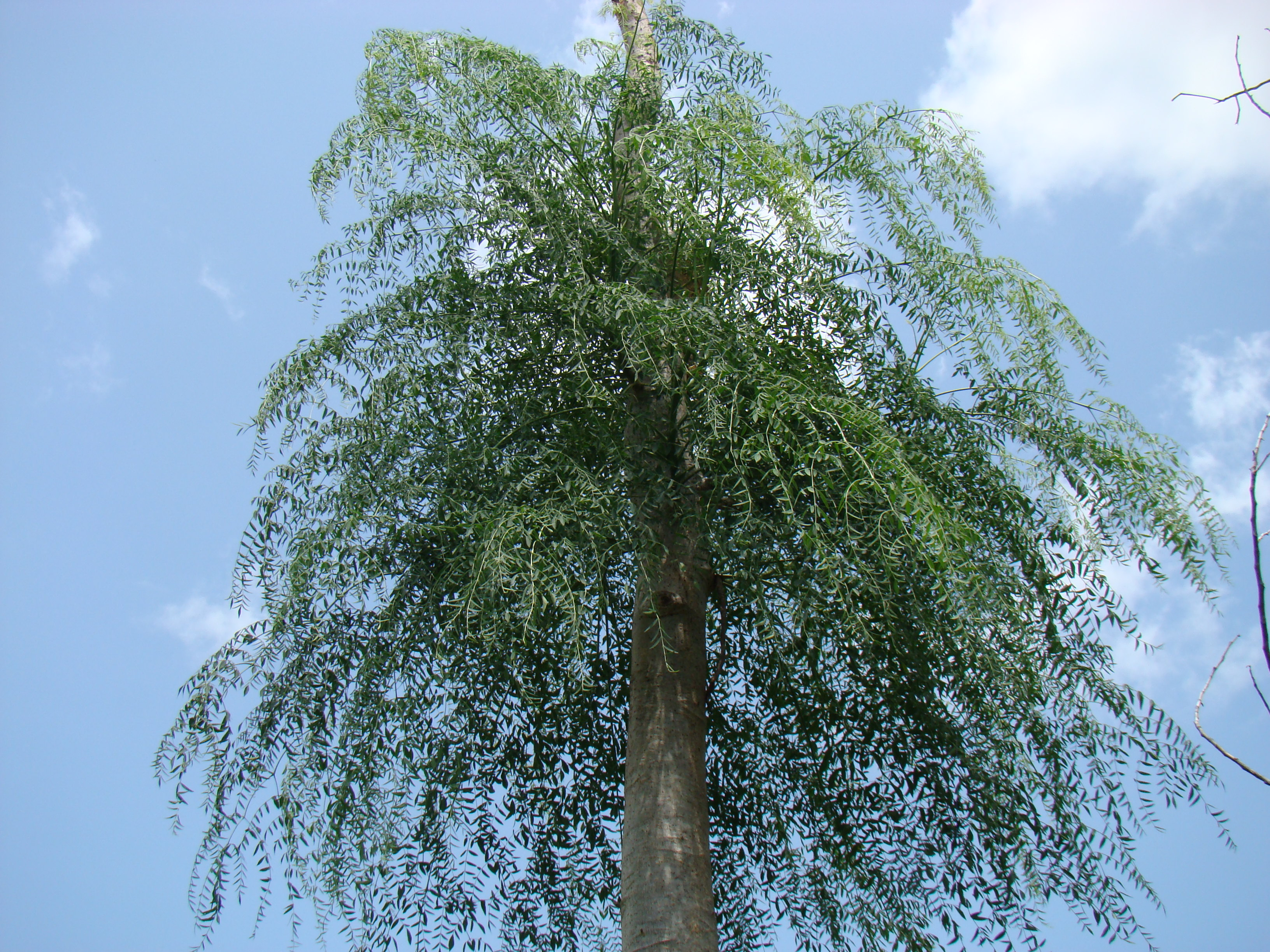
5 June 2010

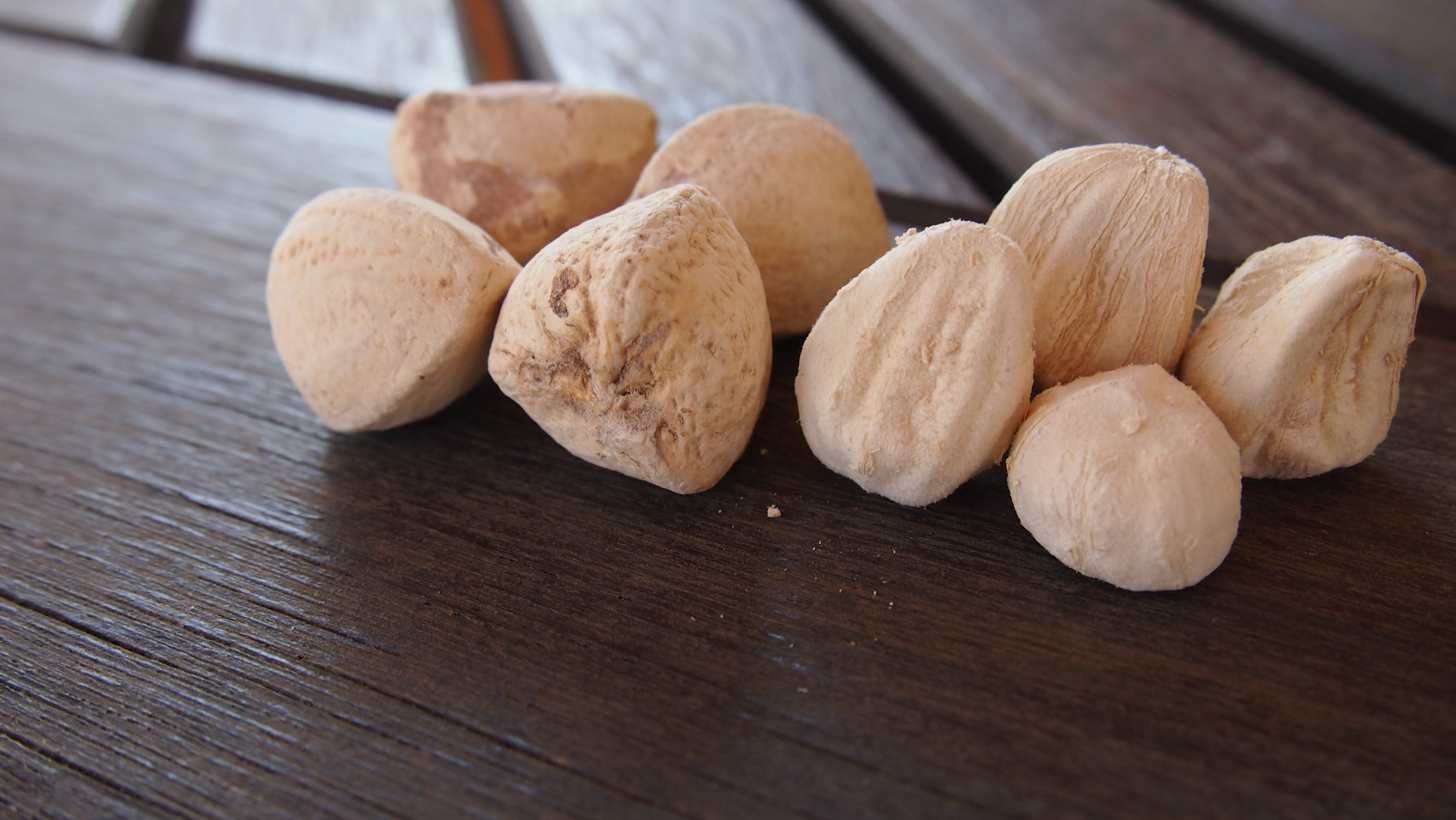
M. drouhardii seeds: entire (left) and without shell (right)

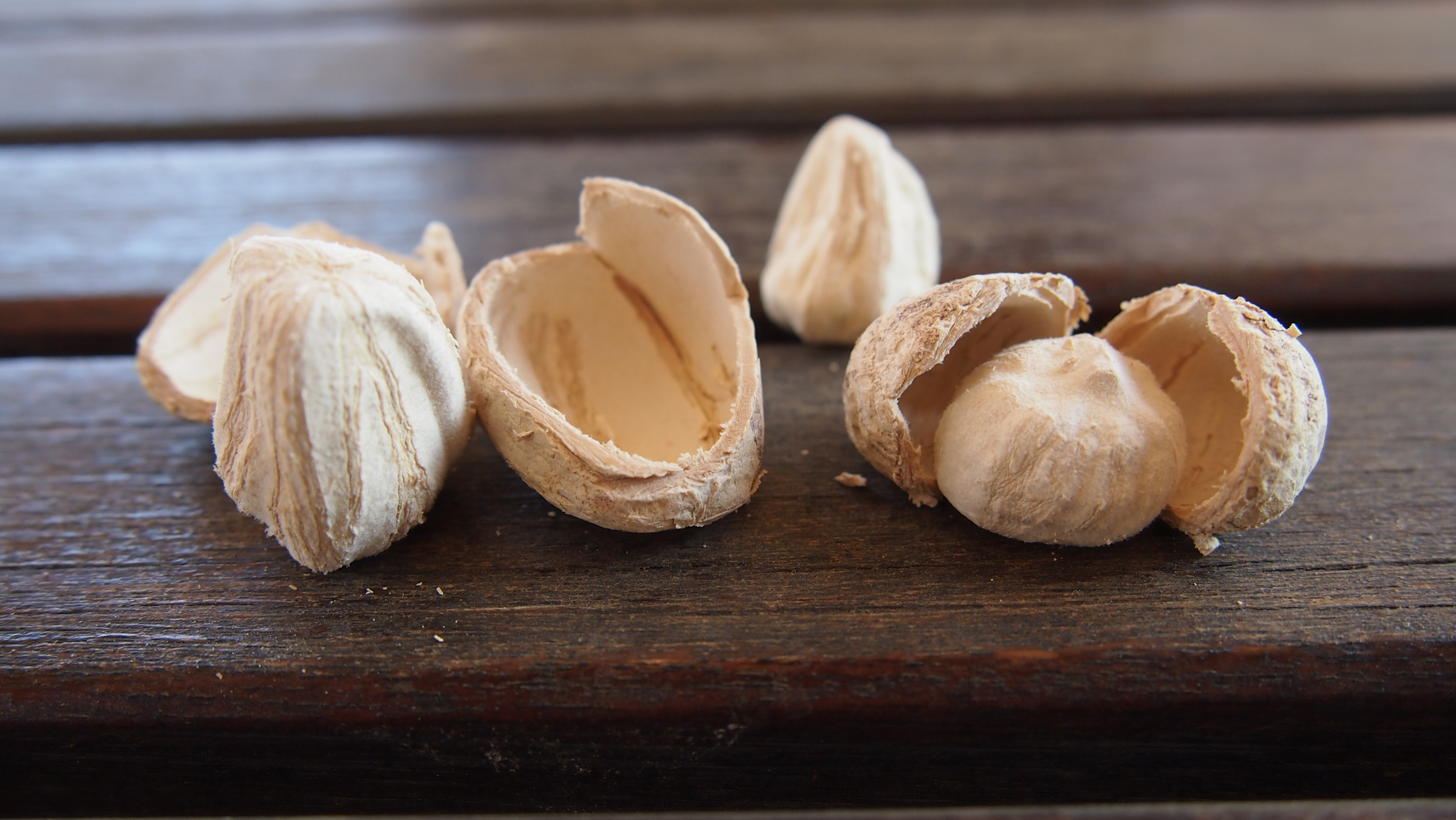
M. drouhardii seeds with cracked outer shells
