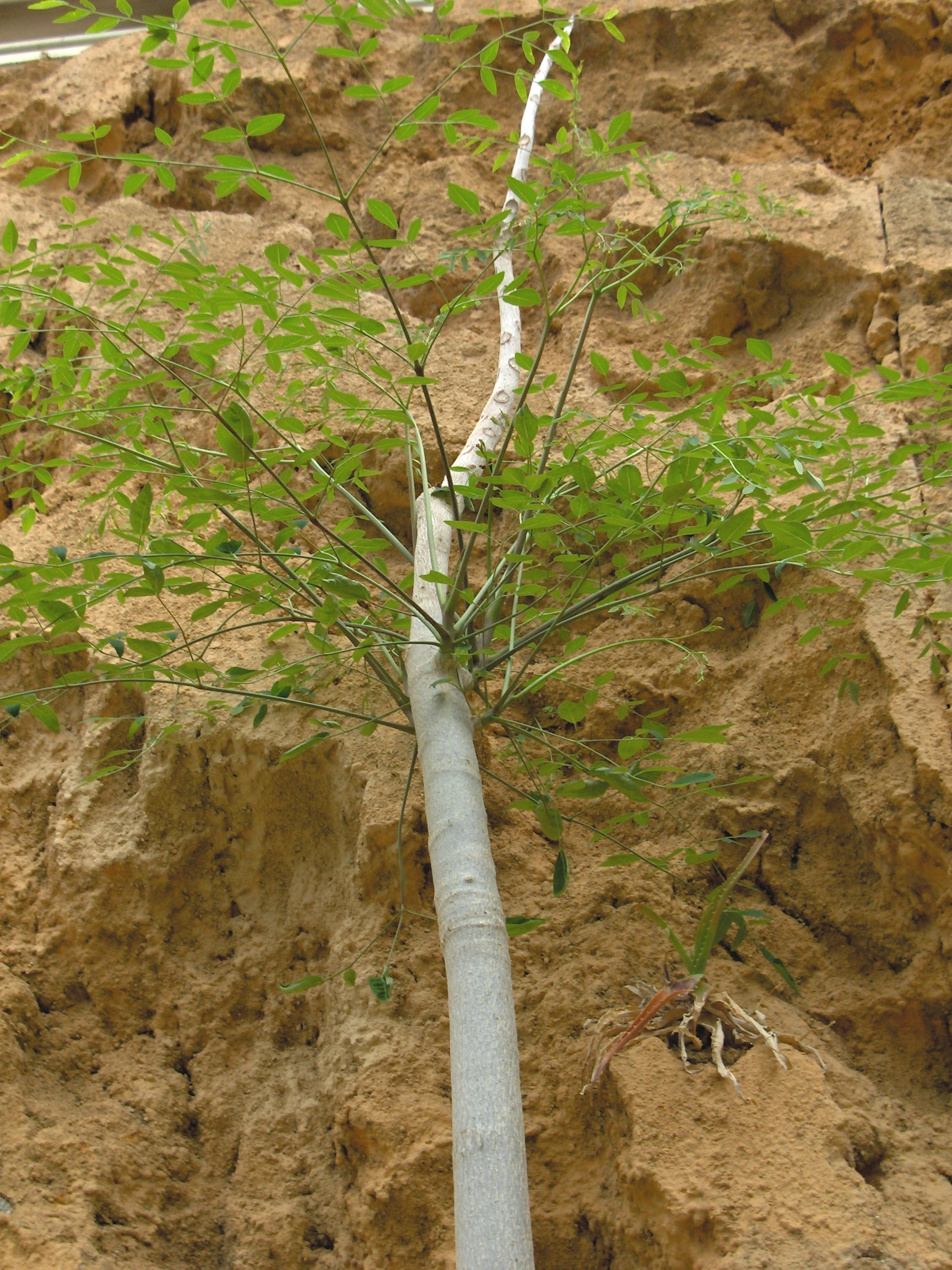
- Trunk and leaves of Moringa hildebrandtii

Conservation status
- Critically Endangered (IUCN 3.1)

Scientific classification
- Kingdom: Plantae
- Clade: Tracheophytes
- Clade: Angiosperms
- Clade: Eudicots
- Clade: Rosids
- Order: Brassicales
- Family: Moringaceae
- Genus: Moringa
- Species: M. hildebrandtii

Binomial name
- Moringa hildebrandtii Engl.

= Moringa hildebrandtii =

Species of tree

Moringa hildebrandtii, or Hildebrandt's moringa, is a tree species with a massive, water-storing trunk in the family Moringaceae. It is endemic to Madagascar, where it is extinct in the wild, but preserved by indigenous horticulture practices.

The plant originally was thought to grow along the west coast of Madagascar, but ethnobotany data suggest it in fact grew in the island's extreme southwest.

== Description ==
The plant's water-storing trunk grows up to 20 m. Its leaves are pinnate, compound, and can reach 1 m long. The leaf rachis and stem tips of young plants are distinctively deep red. Leaves spread around the trunk in an umbrella-like fashion. The small ivory-white flowers are borne in large sprays. Fruits are up to 50 cm long and contain 6 to 12 large nut-shaped seeds in a hard, light brown shell.

== Rediscovery ==
In an article in Cactus World (the quarterly journal of the British Cactus and Succulent Society) the authors claimed to have rediscovered a population of M. hildebrandtii in the wild.
