= List of plants in Tsimanampetsotsa =

This is a list of Vascular plant species occurring in Tsimanampetesotsa National Park, Madagascar.

== List of vascular plants ==
This list of vascular plants found in Tsimanampetsotsa National Park is based primarily on Ratovonaman with the addition of species noted in LaFleur, mentioned in Tropicos or verified observations on INaturalist. Species names were checked for currency and endemisim using the Tropicos Catalogue of the Plants of Madagascar. The name used in the primary reference is given in brackets if different from the current name given in Tropicos. Endemic species are marked with an asterisk *.

FAMILY	SPECIES	COMMON NAME
Acanthaceae	*Achyrocalyx gossypinus	
Acanthaceae	*Anisotes divaricatus	
Acanthaceae	*Anisotes madagascariensis	
Acanthaceae	*Barleria humbertii	
Acanthaceae	*Blepharis calcitrapa	
Acanthaceae	*Crossandra poissonii	
Acanthaceae	*Ecbolium humbertii	
Acanthaceae	*Hypoestes cinerascens	
Acanthaceae	*Justicia spicata	
Acanthaceae	*Ruellia albopurpurea	
Acanthaceae	*Stenandrium humile	
Aloeaceae	Aloe divaricata	
Amaranthaceae	*Aerva madagassica	
Amaranthaceae	Arthrocnemum pachystachyum (Salicornia pachystachya)	Glasswort
Anacardiaceae	*Poupartia minor	
Anacardiaceae	*Operculicarya decaryi	
Anacardiaceae	*Operculicarya hyphaenoïdes	
Apocynaceae	*Cynanchum arenarium	
Apocynaceae	*Pachypodium geayi	
Apocynaceae	*Roupellina boivinii	
Apocynaceae	*Secamone geayi	
Apocynaceae	*Secamone pedicellaris	
Apocynaceae	*Secamone tenuifolia	
Asparagaceae	*Asparagus calcicolus	
Asteraceae	*Distephanus subluteus	
Asteraceae	*Helichrysum mahafaly	
Asteraceae	*Pluchea grevei	
Asteraceae	*Athroisma proteiforme (Polycline proteiformis)	
Bignoniaceae	*Rhigozum madagascariense	
Bignoniaceae	*Stereospermum nematocarpon	
Bignoniaceae	*Stereospermum variabile	
Boraginaceae	*Ehretia decaryi	
Brassicaceae	*Boscia longifolia	
Brassicaceae	Cadaba virgata	
Brassicaceae	*Maerua filiformis	
Buddlejaceae	*Androya decaryi	
Burseraceae	*Commiphora brevicalyx	
Burseraceae	*Commiphora humbertii	
Burseraceae	*Commiphora lamii	
Burseraceae	*Commiphora mahafaliensis	
Burseraceae	*Commiphora marchandii	
Burseraceae	*Commiphora monstruosa	
Burseraceae	*Commiphora orbicularis	
Burseraceae	*Commiphora simplicifolia	
Burseraceae	*Commiphora sinuata	
Casuarinaceae	Casuarina equisetifolia	beach sheoak (likely introduced)
Celastraceae	Gymnosporia linearis	
Celastraceae	Loeseneriella urceolus	
Celastraceae	*Salvadoropsis arenicola	
Combretaceae	*Combretum grandidieri	
Combretaceae	*Terminalia disjuncta	
Combretaceae	*Terminalia seyrigii	
Combretaceae	*Terminalia ulexoïdes	
Convolvulaceae	*Hildebrandtia austinii	
Convolvulaceae	*Hildebrandtia promontorii	
Crassulaceae	*Kalanchoe millotii	
Didiereaceae	*Alluaudia comosa	compass tree
Didiereaceae	*Alluaudia humbertii	
Didiereaceae	*Alluaudia procera	Madagascar ocotillo
Didiereaceae	*Alluiaudia montagnacii	
Didiereaceae	*Alluaudiopsis fiherenensis	
Didiereaceae	*Didierea madagascariensis	octopus tree
Dioscoreaceae	*Dioscorea nako	
Ebenaceae	*Diospyros humbertiana	
Ebenaceae	*Diospyros manampetsae	
Erythroxylaceae	*Erythroxylum leandrianum (retusum)	
Euphorbiaceae	*Acalypha decaryana	
Euphorbiaceae	*Croton cotoneaster	
Euphorbiaceae	*Croton geayi	
Euphorbiaceae	*Croton salviformis	
Euphorbiaceae	*Euphorbia alluaudii ssp. oncoclada	
Euphorbiaceae	*Euphorbia plagiantha	
Euphorbiaceae	Euphorbia stenoclada	silver thicket
Euphorbiaceae	Euphorbia tirucalli	
Euphorbiaceae	*Securinega seyrigii	
Fabaceae	*Acacia bellula	
Fabaceae	*Alantsilodendron alluaudianum	
Fabaceae	*Albizia atakataka	
Fabaceae	*Albizia mahalao	
Fabaceae	*Albizia tulearensis	
Fabaceae	*Bauhinia grandidieri	
Fabaceae	*Chadsia grevei	
Fabaceae	*Delonix edulis	
Fabaceae	*Delonix floribunda	
Fabaceae	*Dichrostachys tenuifolia	
Fabaceae	*Crotalaria androyensis	
Fabaceae	*Indigofera mahafalensis (Vaughania mahafalensis)	
Fabaceae	*Dicraeopetalum mahafaliense	
Fabaceae	*Indigofera mouroundavensis	
Fabaceae	*Delonix edulis (Lemuropisum edule)	
Fabaceae	Mimosa delicatula	
Fabaceae	*Senna meridionalis	
Fabaceae	Tamarindus indica	
Fabaceae	*Tephrosia alba	
Fabaceae	*Tephrosia bibracteolata	
Fabaceae	*Tetrapterocarpon geayi	
Fabaceae	Vaughania depauperata	
Hernandiaceae	Gyrocarpus americanus	
Lamiaceae	*Karomia microphylla	
Lythraceae	*Capuronianthus mahafalensis	
Lythraceae	Lawsonia inermis (introduced species)	
Malvaceae	*Adansonia rubrostipa	Fony baobab
Malvaceae	*Grewia grevei	
Malvaceae	*Grewia humblotii	
Malvaceae	*Grewia mahafaliensis	
Malvaceae	*Grewia tulearensis	
Malvaceae	*Humbertiella quararibeoides	
Meliaceae	*Calodecaryia pauciflora	
Meliaceae	*Neobeguea mahafaliensis	
Moraceae	*Ficus humbertii	fig
Moraceae	*Ficus marmorata	fig
Moraceae	*Ficus menabeensis	fig
Moraceae	Ficus polita (F. megapoda)	fig
Moringaceae	*Moringa drouhardii	bottle tree
Olacaceae	Olax dissitiflora (Olax andronensis)	
Olacaceae	*Ximenia perrieri	
Papaveraceae	Argemone mexicana	Mexican prickly poppy (introduced)
Passifloraceae	*Adenia olaboensis	
Pedaliaceae	*Uncarina stellulifera	
Plumbaginaceae	Plumbago aphylla	
Polygalaceae	*Polygala greveana	
Portulacaceae	*Talinella microphylla	
Ptaeroxylaceae	*Cedrelopsis gracilis	
Ptaeroxylaceae	*Cedrelopsis grevei	
Pteridaceae	Acrostichum aureum	golden leather fern
Rubiaceae	*Catunaregam spinosa	
Rubiaceae	*Lathraeocarpa acicularis	
Rubiaceae	*Paederia grandidieri	
Salvadoraceae	Azima tetracantha	
Salvadoraceae	Salvadora angustifolia	
Sapindaceae	*Erythrophysa aesculina	
Scrophulariaceae	*Leucosalpa poissonii	
Solanaceae	Lycium elliotii (Lycium acutifolium)	
Solanaceae	Solanum sp.	
Talinaceae	*Talinella microphylla	
Typhaceae	Typha domingensis (Typha angustifolia in error)	southern cattail
Velloziaceae	Xerophyta dasylirioides	
Velloziaceae	Xerophyta tulearensis	
Verbenaceae	Clerodendrum sp.	
Vitaceae	*Cissus bosseri	
Vitaceae	*Cyphostemma elephantopus	
Zygophyllaceae	Tetraena madagascariensis (Zygophyllum depauperatum)	
