= Tsimanampetsotsa National Park =

National park in Madagascar

- IUCN category II (national park)
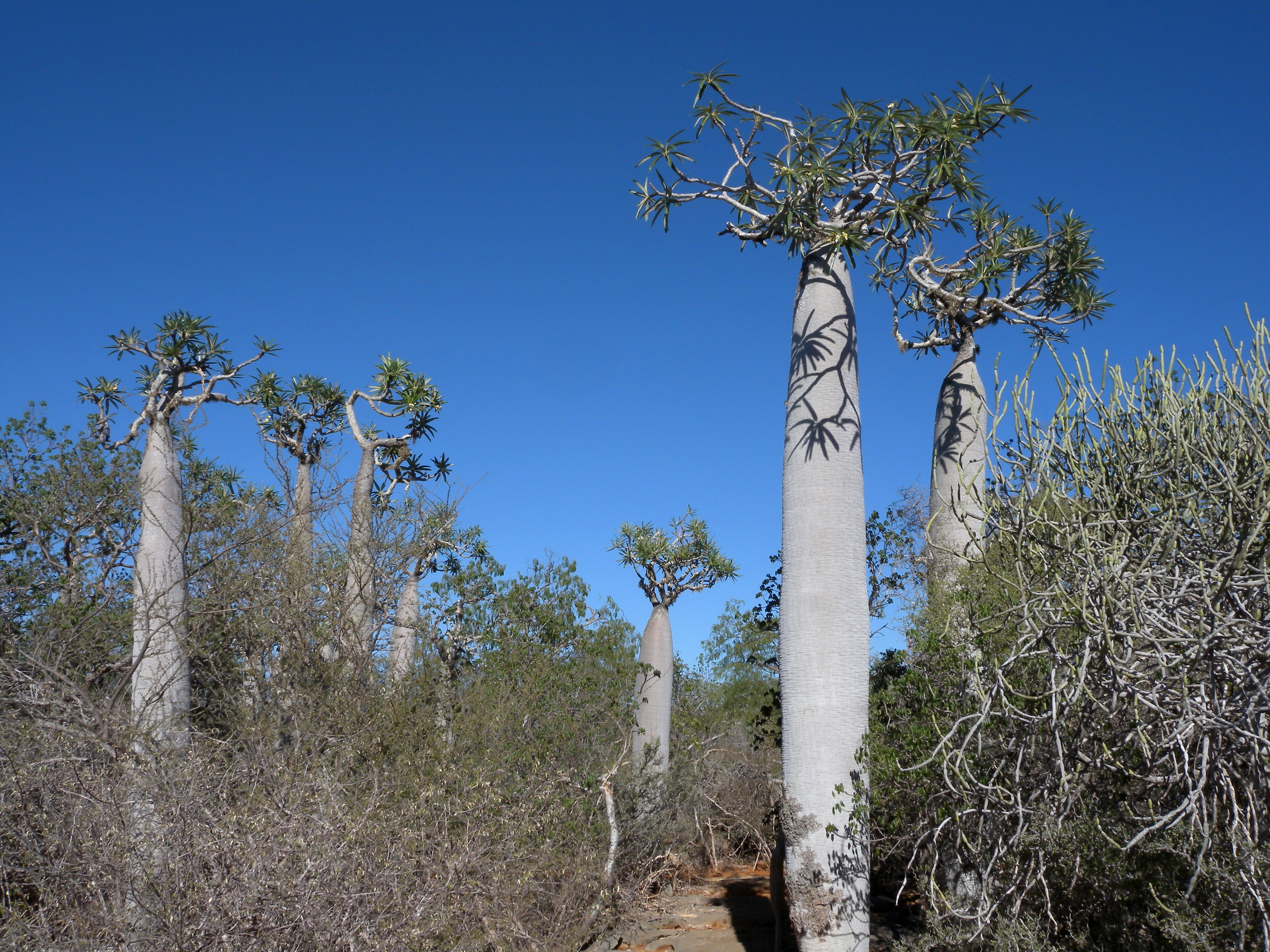
- Pachypodium geayi in Tsimanampetsotsa

- Location within Madagascar
- Location: South-west Madagascar
- Nearest city: Efoetsy, Toliara
- Coordinates: 24.099°S 43.832°E
- Area: 432 km^{2} (167 mi^{2})
- Established: 1927
- Website: parcs-madagascar.com/parcs/tsimanapesotse.php

Ramsar Wetland
- Official name: Parc national Tsimanampesotse
- Designated: 25 September 1998
- Reference no.: 962

Tsimanampetsotsa National Park also spelt Tsimanampetsotse, and known as Tsimanampetsotsa Nature Reserve is a 432 km^{2} national park on the south-west coast of Madagascar in the region Atsimo-Andrefana. The park is 90 kilometres (56 mi) south of Toliara and 950 kilometres (590 mi) south of the capital, Antananarivo. Route Nationales (RN) 10 to Faux Cap passes the park and the nearest airport is at Toliara. The national park contains and is named after Lake Tsimanampetsotsa.

== History and Significance ==
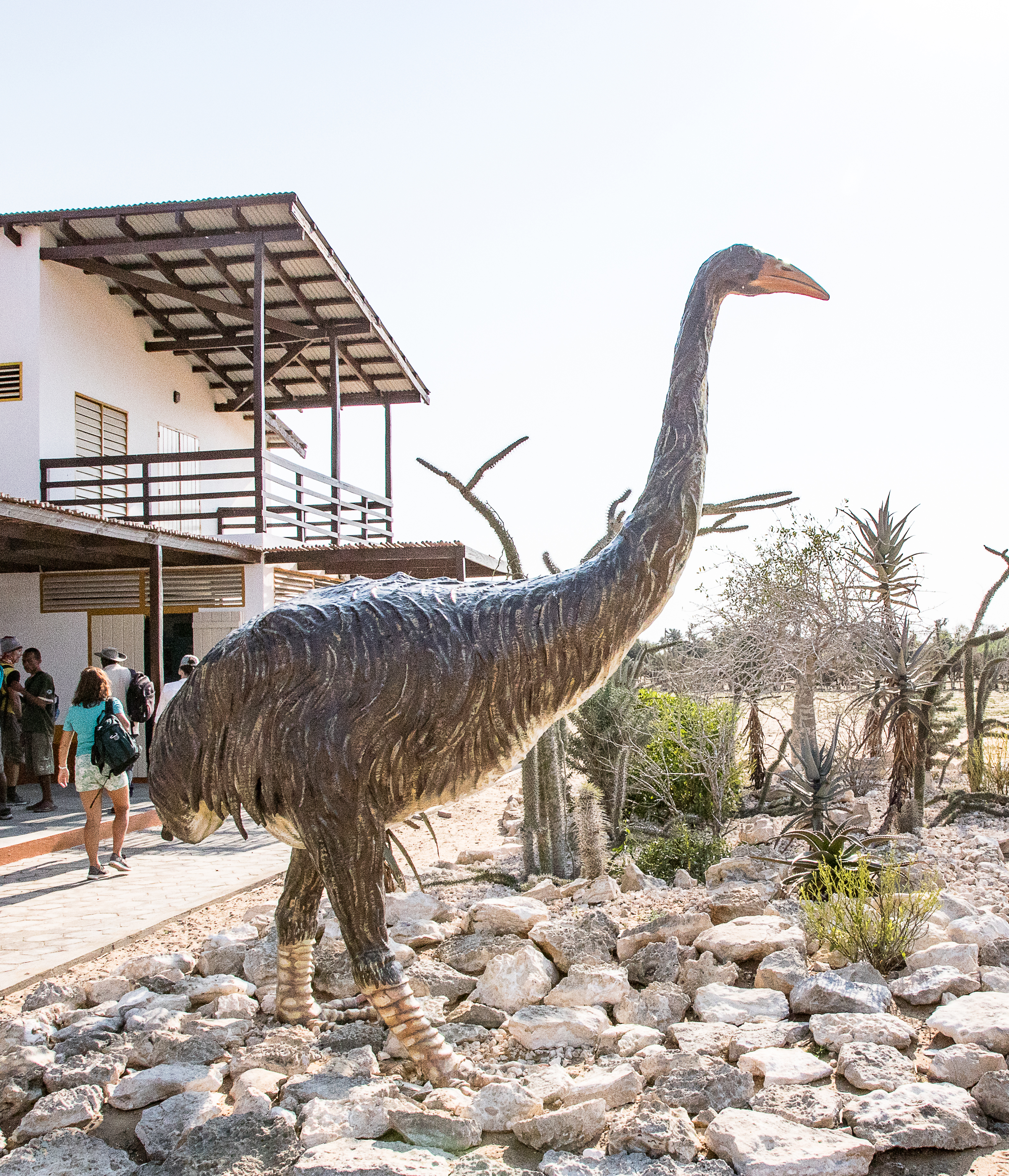
Elephant bird statue at the entrance to Tsimanampetsotsa NP

Tsimanampetsotsa National Park encompasses the westernmost escarpment of the limestone Mahafaly Plateau. It was first protected in 1927 for its endemic flora and fauna and became a national park in 1966. It is within the Madagascar spiny forests or "spiny desert" of southern Madagascar, a globally distinctive ecoregion. This is the area with the highest level of plant endemism in Madagascar, with 48% of the genera and 95% of the species endemic and is listed as one of the 200 most important ecological regions in the world. The vegetation is characterized by many xerophytic and drought tolerant woody species of the Spurge family (Euphorbiaceae) and of the subfamily Didiereoideae, which is narrowly endemic to the southwest of Madagascar. In addition to exceptional plant diversity, Tsimanampetsotsa National Park is home to six species of primates representing four of the five families endemic to Madagascar. Several endemic animals, restricted to the dry south of Madagascar, occur here, including the recently described Grandidier's mongoose (Galidictis grandidieri) and the Madagascar radiated tortoise or sokake (Geochelone radiata). The national park contains and is named after Lake Tsimanampetsotsa, an important wetland which is registered as a Ramsar Wetland of International Importance, designated in 1998. In the 1930s Henri Perrier de la Bâthie discovered subfossil remains of many different species, including giant tortoise, crocodiles and eggshell fragments of elephant birds. Recent surveys confirm that Tsimanampetsotsa National Park is rich in fossils.

In July 2018, Tsimanampesotse – Nosy Ve Androka was established as Madagascar's 5th Biosphere Reserve. It belongs to the intertropical marine biogeographic system of the Southwest Indian Ocean and includes five large Malagasy ecoregions: the South Terrestrial Ecoregion, the Aquatic Ecoregion of the southern basins, the Aquatic Ecoregion of the West Basins, the Mozambique Mozambique Channel Marine Ecoregion and the South Marine Ecoregion. The core of the biosphere reserve is composed of the Tsimanampesotse National Park and the Nosy Ve-Androka National Park, managed by Madagascar National Parks; and Amoron'i Onilahy Category IV protected area, managed by local communities.

== Climate ==
The climate is hot and dry and the annual rainfall is less than 300 millimetres (12 in), which makes the area the driest in the country. The majority of rainfall occurs between late December and February and the dry season is long, with average durations of nine to eleven months. The minimum winter temperature averages 15 °C (59 °F) to 20 °C (68 °F) with maximum temperatures exceeding 40 °C (104 °F) in the rest of the year.

== Landscapes ==
The park can be divided into four distinct landscapes, as follows:

=== Tsimanampetsotsa Lake and associated shore zone ===
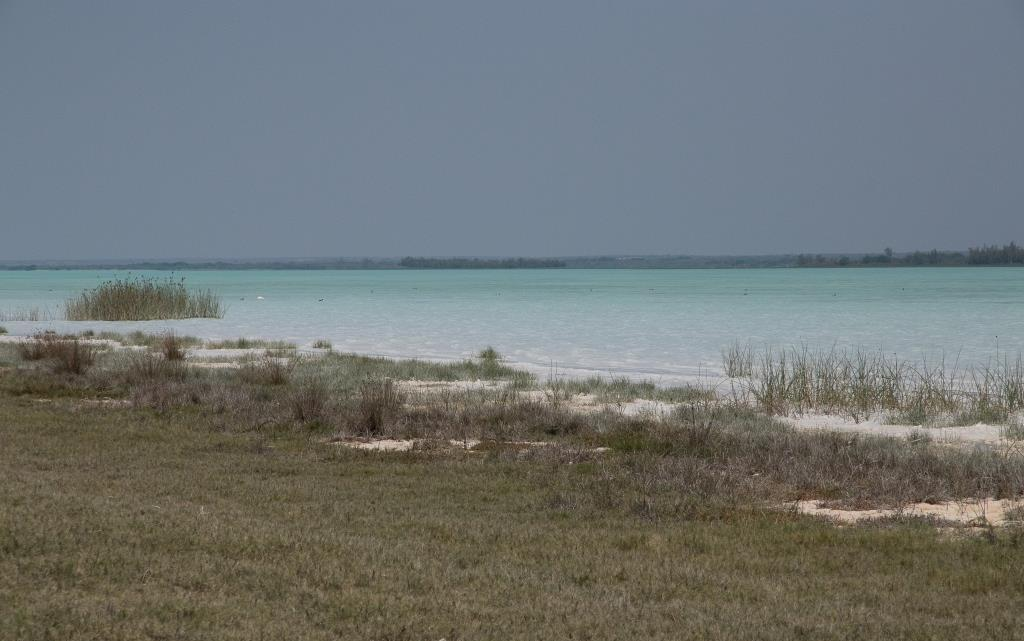
Tsimanampetsotsa lakeshore

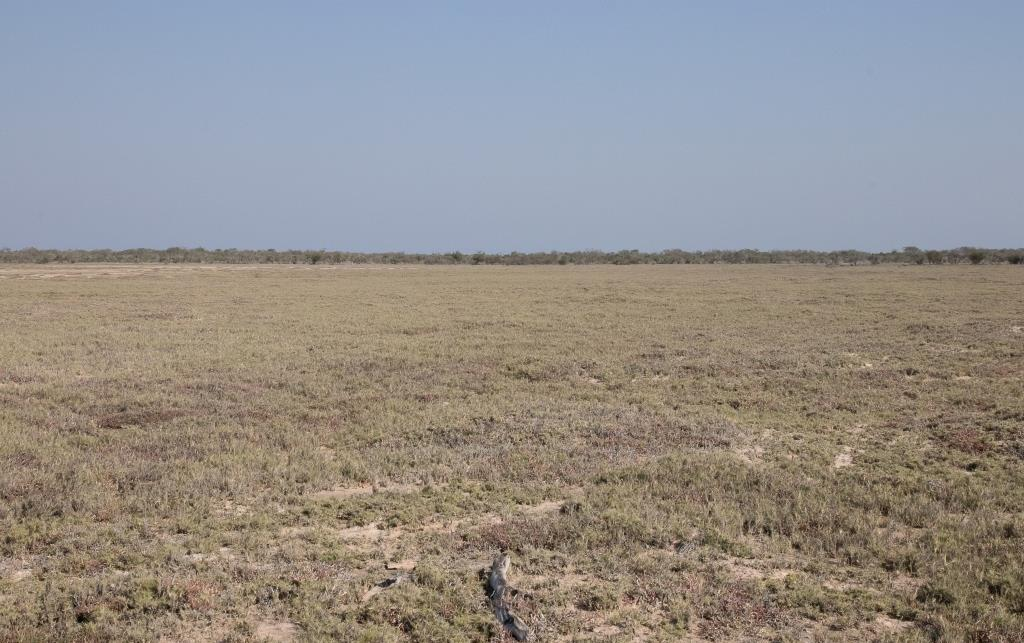
saline flats Lake Tsimanampetsosa

Lake Tsimanampetsotsa is a relatively shallow lake of highly mineralized, moderately alkaline water with salt concentrations approaching that of sea water. There are no fish living in the lake, but invertebrates belonging to four taxonomic groups (Annelida, Gastropoda, Crustacea and Insecta) have been documented. High phosphate concentrations, originating from erosion, are thought to be the main factor limiting the diversity of aquatic fauna.

The lake is in a shallow basin and the area covered by water shrinks dramatically in the dry season, resulting in extensive exposed hypersaline flats. Glasswort (Salicornia pachystachya or Arthrocnemum pachystachyum) and other salt-tolerant plant species such as the golden leather fern (Acrostichum aureum) move onto the flats as the water levels recede. The introduced species beach sheoak (Casuarina equisetifolia) can be found in small stands along the east shore as well as a narrow band of Salvadora angustifolia trees.

=== Mahafaly Plateau edge ===
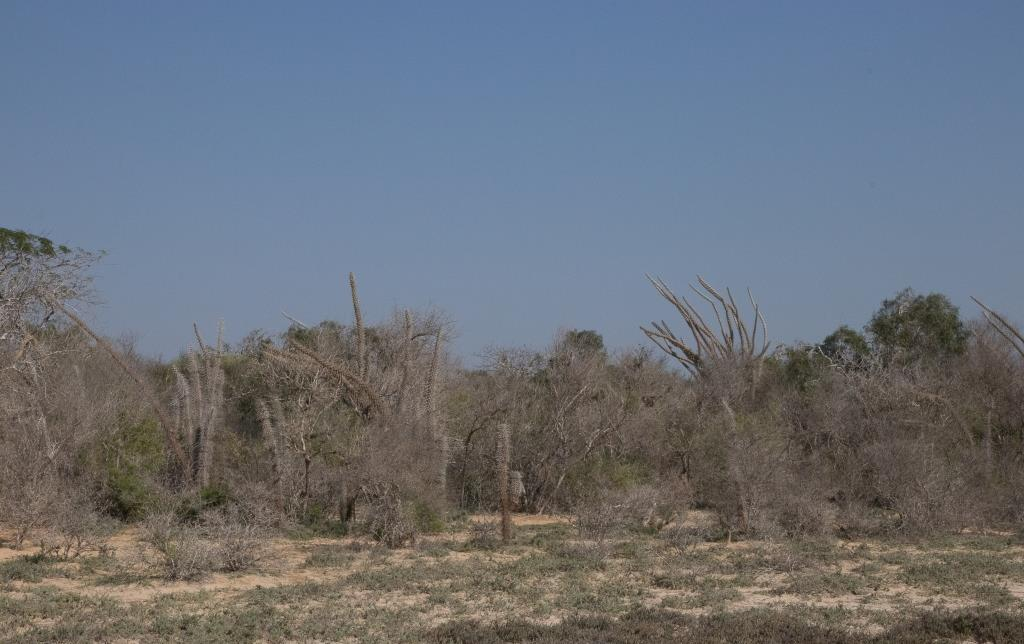
dry forest on sandy soils

East from the lake basin, at the foot of the Mahafaly Plateau, is the second zone; dry forest on sandy soils derived from sand deposits of recent and Quaternary origin. The vegetation is made up mostly of short statured trees, shrubs and open unvegetated areas. Some underground water drains under the Mahafaly Plateau, and comes to the surface at the foot of the plateau in caves or as seeps and springs. These areas of ephemeral or permanent water sources support larger fruit trees (e.g. Ficus polita, Tamarindus indica, Salvadoria angustifolia), add greatly to the biodiversity of the zone and are usually found near the border of the third zone, the limestone Mahafaly Plateau.

=== Mahafaly Plateau ===
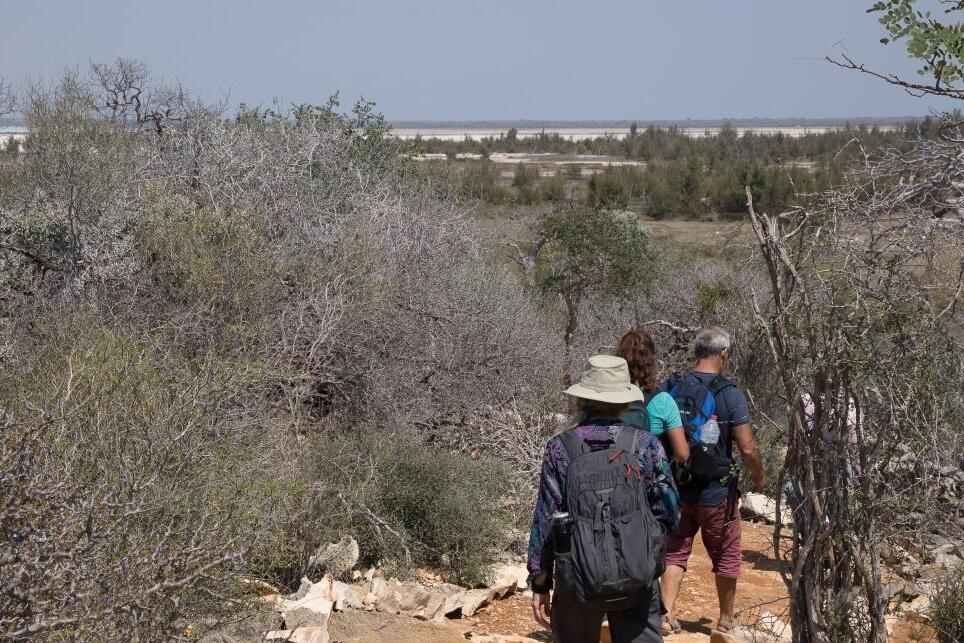
trail to lookout on the Mahafaly Plateau

The Mahafaly Plateau is composed of Tertiary limestone, with soils that are thin and calcareous. The vegetation is made up of open, xerophytic thickets, primarily from the families spurge (Euphorbiaceae), Didiereaceae, kapok (Bombaceae), and pea (Fabaceae). Prominent in this area are silver thicket (Euphorbia stenoclada) and the bottle tree (Moringa drouhardii).The plateau area is a relatively narrow formation, running north–south, and found between the lake margin and the "eastern zone". Numerous collapsed "sinks" can found here, and they provide habitat for plants and animals that rely on a minimum of ephemeral water. Associated with the limestone cliffs are several endemic animals species including the Grandidier's mongoose (Galidictis grandidieri), a blind cave-dwelling fish (Typhleotris madagascariensis) and species of restricted distribution such as the nocturnal gecko (Ebenavia maintimainty) and the skink (Mabuya vezo).

=== Eastern Zone ===
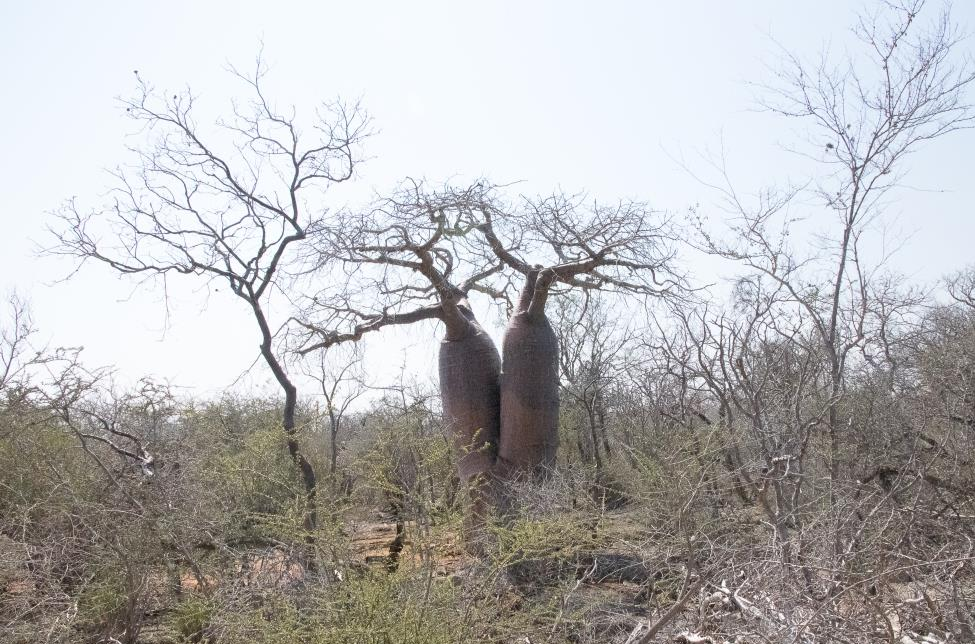
dry forest with Fony baobab

The fourth and easternmost zone is found where the limestone of the plateau gives way to an area of red clay soils. The soils are ferruginous and more conducive to plant growth. Here the vegetation is dry forest or spiny bush with Didiereaceae, Euphorbiaeceae, and Myrrh (Burseraceae) the dominant plant families. Octopus tree (Didieria madagascariensis) is a prominent member of the forests found in this landscape and it is in this zone that several exceptional fony baobabs (Adansonia rubrostipa) and large Pachypodium geayi can be viewed.

== Visiting Tsimanampetsotsa National Park ==
Tsimanampetsotsa is approximately a 2-hour drive from Anakao, via a sandy track best driven by a 4x4. The area tends to be hot and dry, and at times there can be mosquitoes or other biting insects. There are two campsites and several walks of differing duration and interests.

=== Hiking ===
There are several hikes that leave from the campsite and parking area near the north end of the lake on the east side:

- Tsiamaso circuit, which includes the Mitoho Grotto (cave) with its blind fish, (Typhleotris madagascariensis)
- Andaka circuit, which follows the lake's shore to watch birds
- Emande circuit, to visit tombs and some wonderful landscapes
- Andalamaike circuit, for a botanical walk through arid landscapes and spiney forest.

There is also a car park, about halfway along the east side of the lake with a gazebo for shade. From here, it is a short walk west to the lake for birdwatching. To the east, is a short, but steep walk of about 200 metres (660 ft) to the top of the Mahafaly Plateau. Some scrambling over rocks may be required, but it provides splendid views across the lake.

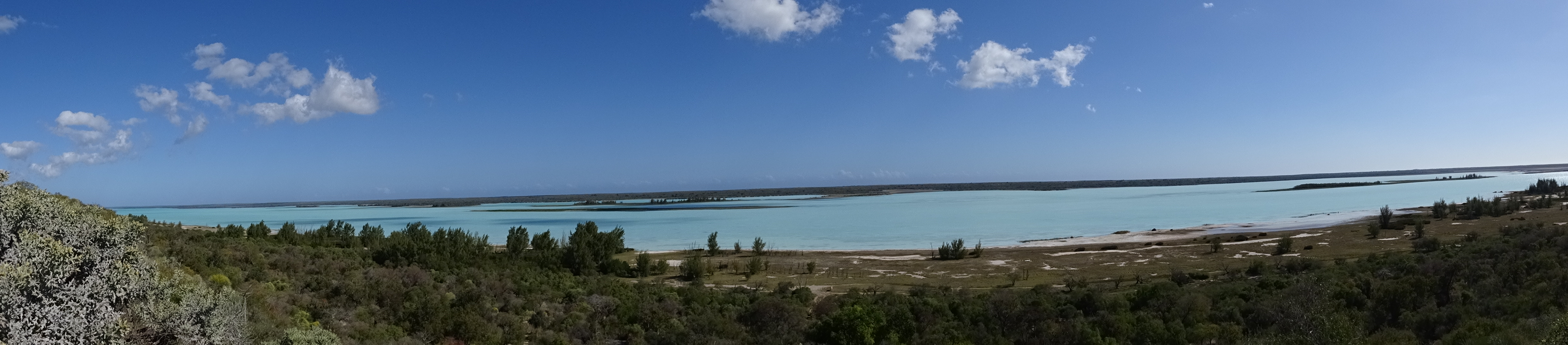
Tsimanampetsotsa Lake from the viewpoint

== Special Features ==
=== Mitoho Cave ===
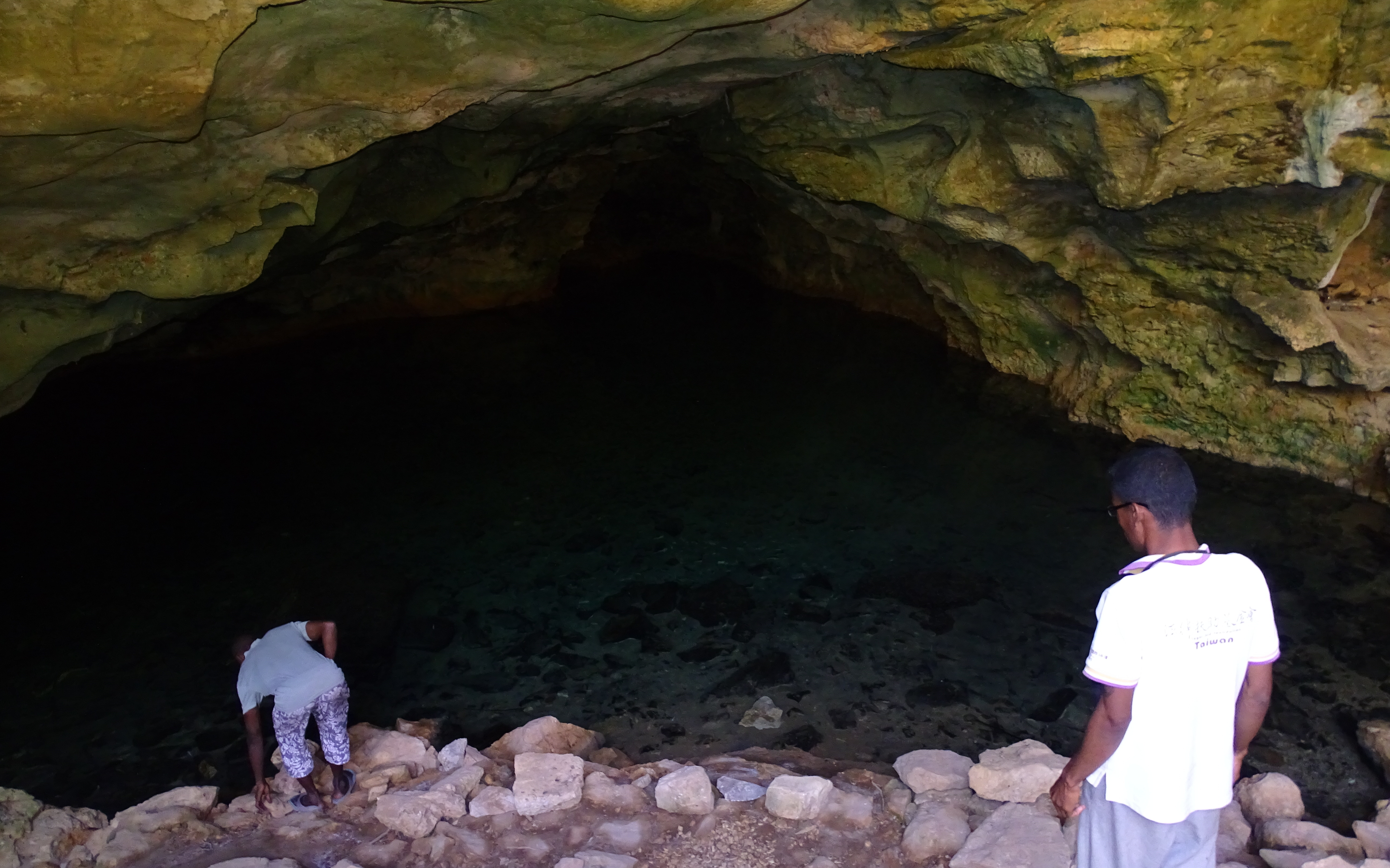
Mitoho Grotto (a sacred cave in Tsimanampetsotse National Park)

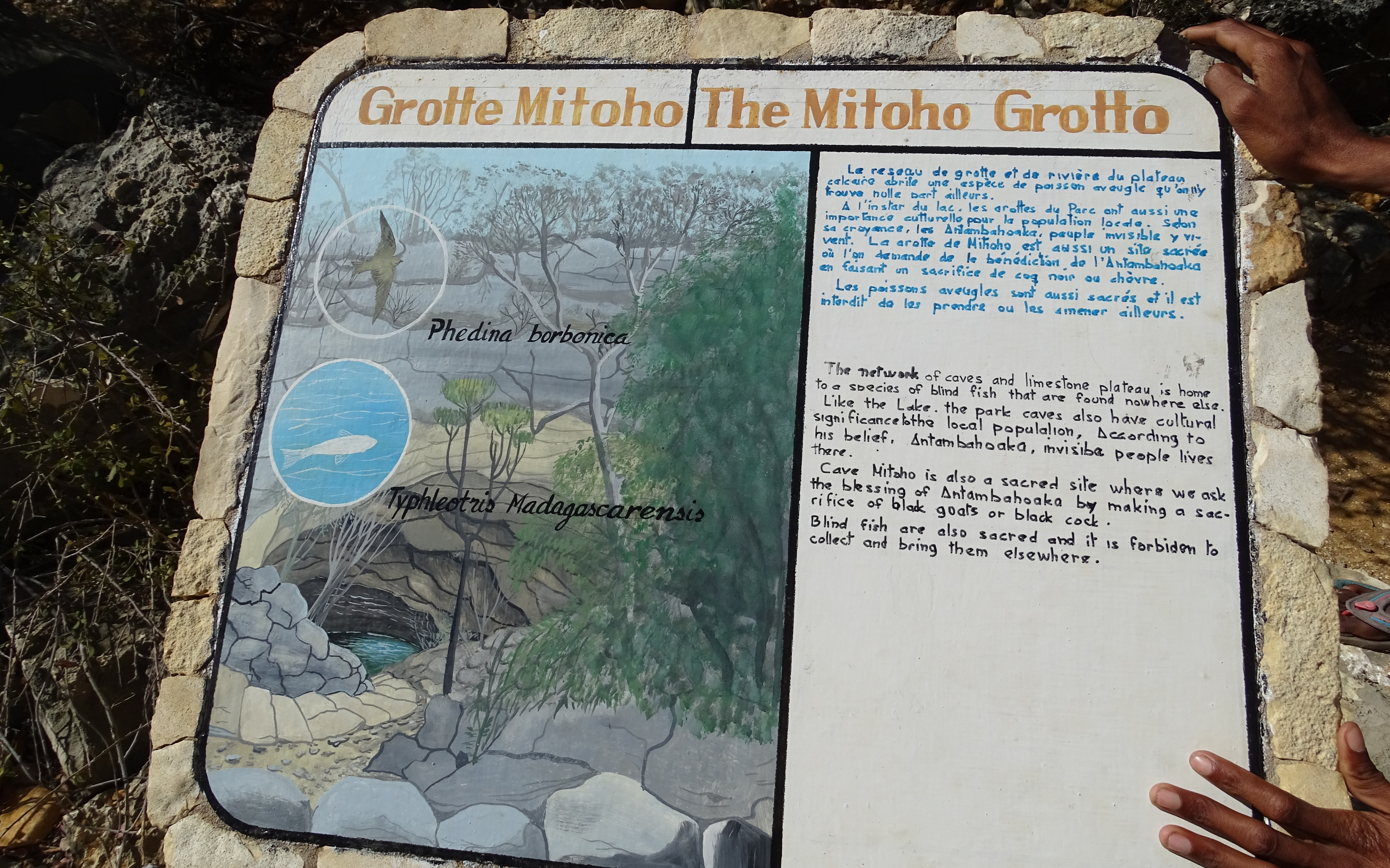
Mitoho cave notice board with details of Typhleotris madagascariensis

Mitoho Grotto lies at the end of the nature trail from one of the two campsites. This is a sacred site where, according to the local beliefs of the Antambahoka, an invisible people live. In a permanent lake within the limestone cave system lives a species of blind fish (Typhleotris madagascariensis) that feed on shrimp. There is also a colony of Mascarene martin (Phedina borbonica) nesting at the mouth of the cave. In addition to these more well-known species there is the Mitoho Cave Giant Pill-Millipede (Zoosphaerium mitoho) endemic to the dry spiny forests of the Tsimanampetsotsa National Park.

Mitoho Grotto is also a significant fossil location. In the 1930s Henri Perrier de la Bâthie found subfossil remains of giant tortoise and crocodiles and eggshell fragments of elephant birds and of giant lemur (Megaladapis edwardsi).

=== Ancient Baobabs ===
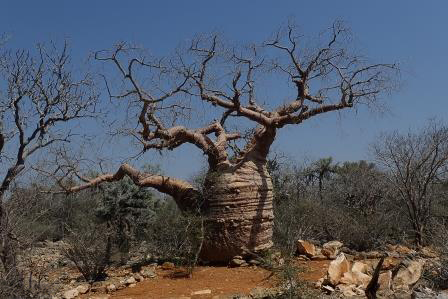
"Grandmother" Fony baobab

A hike can be linked on to the visit to Mitoho Grotto that goes past several huge, ancient Fony baobabs (Adansonia rubrostipa). A short, squat tree (growing 4 to 5 m tall) with a wide trunk, several here are hundreds of years old. Two have been studied using radiocarbon dating. One called "Grandmother" is made up of 3 fused trunks of different ages, with the oldest part of the tree an estimated 1,600 years old. The second, "polygamous baobab", has six fused stems, and is an estimated 1,000 years old. This hike also goes through the spiny forest, with many of the narrowly endemic plant species found only in this part of Madagascar.

=== Banyan Tree Sinkhole ===
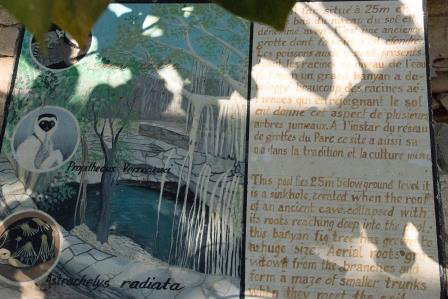
sign at the banyan fig sinkhole

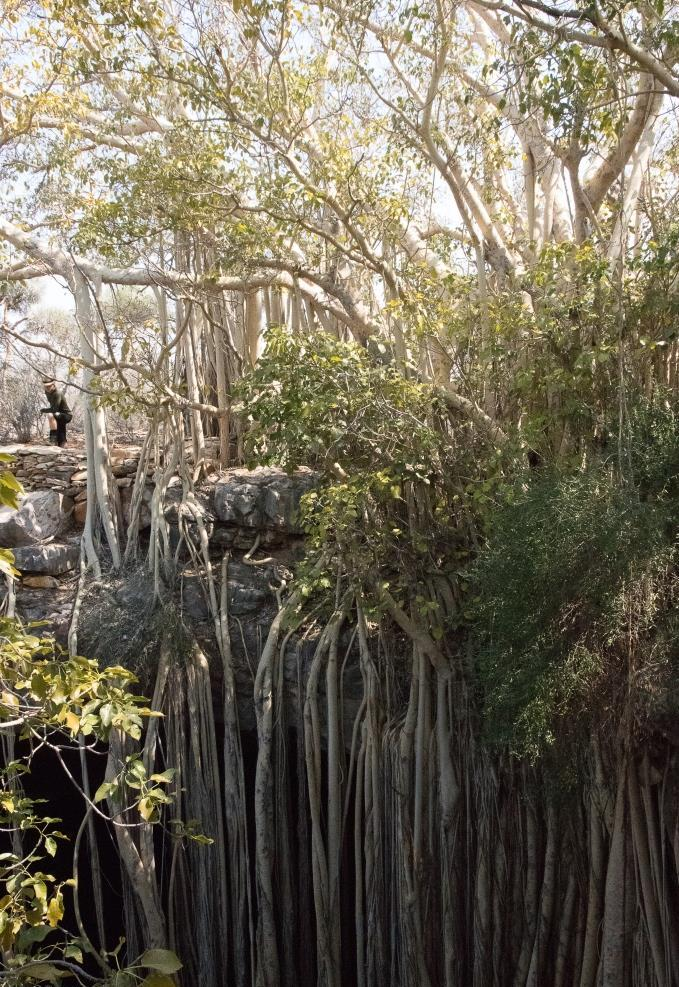
banyan fig at sinkhole

Continuing past the baobabs, the trail leads to the Banyan Tree site. This is a classic vertical sink hole, about 25 m in circumference resulting from the collapse of a cave. About 10 to 12 m below the rim of the sink hole is a pool and growing at the edge of the sinkhole, with roots reaching down into the water is a large banyan fig tree. Fossils have also been found here, showing a cross-section of the known extinct fauna found in the region.

== Fauna ==
=== Mammals ===
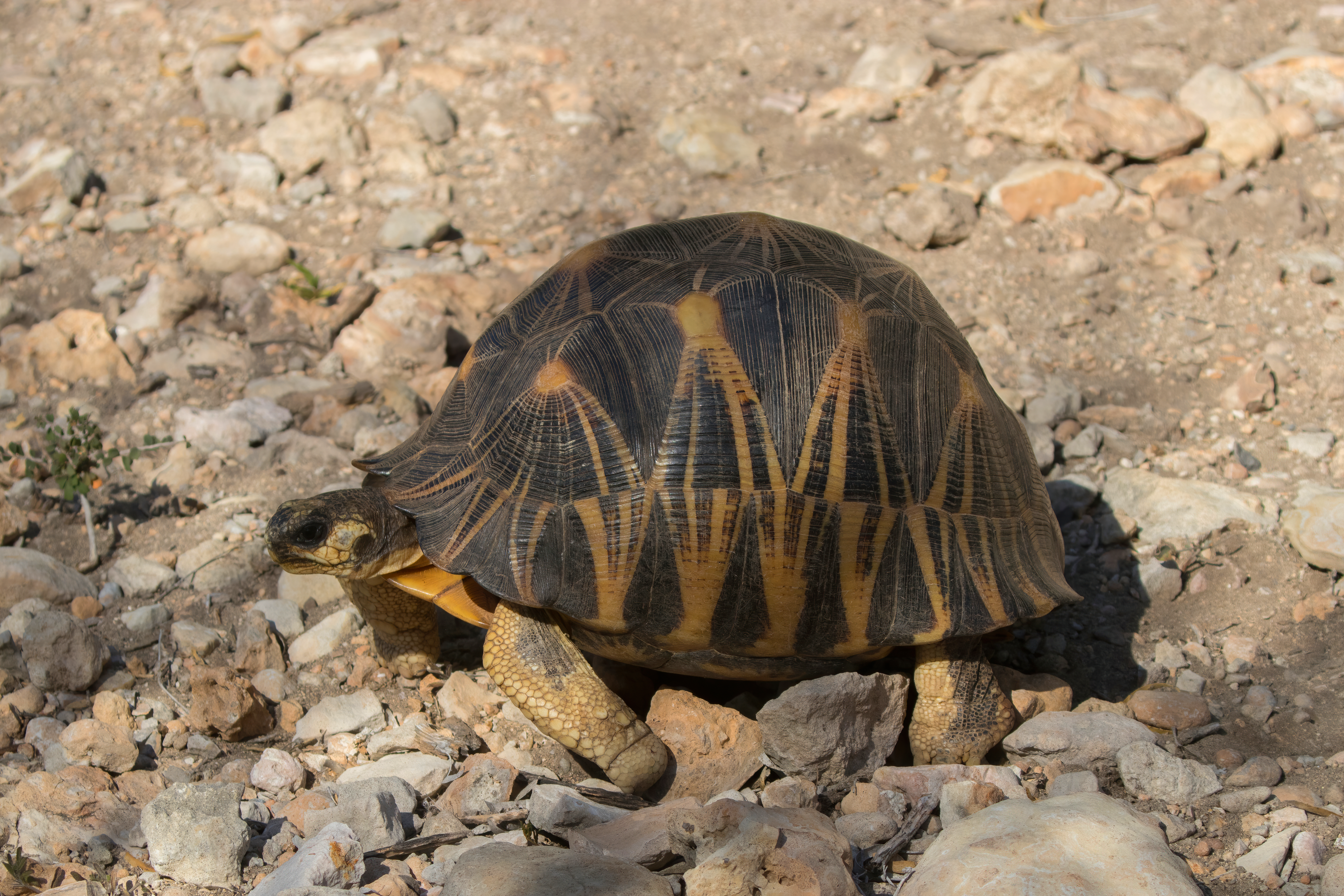
Critically endangered radiated tortoise

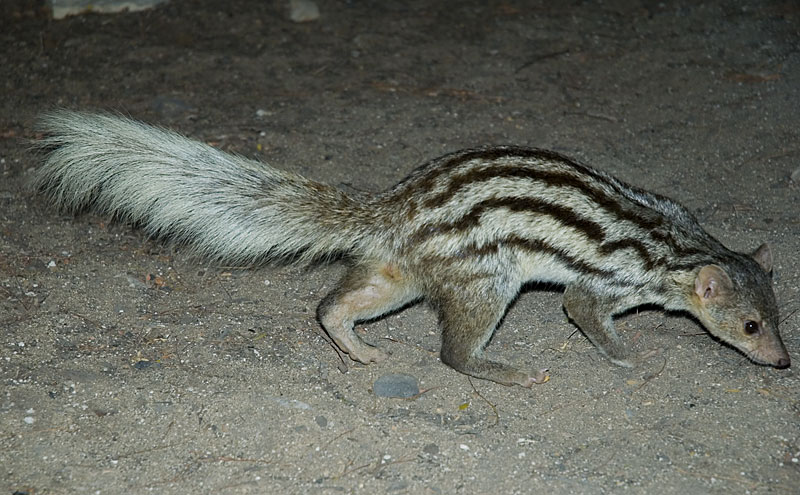
Grandidier's mongoose (Galidictis grandidieri) in Tsimanampetsotsa National Park

Tsimanampetsotsa National Park is the only documented location for the endangered Grandidier's mongoose (Galidictis grandidieri), described as new to science in 1986. Five species of lemur are found here - the White-footed sportive lemur (Lepilemur leucopus) and the Reddish-gray mouse lemur (Microcebus griseorufus) are strictly endemic to the spiny forests of this part of Madagascar. Near-endemic mammals include the Large-eared tenrec (Geogale aurita), and the Lesser hedgehog tenrec (Echinops telfairi).

List of lemur species found in Tsimanampetsotsa National Park
| Viewing time | Species |
|---|---|
| Daytime | Ring-tailed lemur (Lemur catta); Verreaux's sifaka (Propithecus verreauxi) |
| Nighttime | Reddish-gray mouse lemur (Microcebus griseorufus); Fat-tailed dwarf lemur (Cheirogaleus medius); White-footed sportive lemur (Lepilemur leucopus) |

=== Birds ===
At least 112 species of birds are known from the park, of which thirty-five are endemic to Madagascar. Species associated with the lake include the Madagascan plover (Charadrius thoracicus) which is listed by the International Union for Conservation of Nature (IUCN) as a vulnerable species and the endangered Madagascar Grebe (Tachybaptus pelzelnii). Lesser Flamingo (Phoeniconaias minor) frequent the lake and it is an important beeding area for Greater Flamingo (Phoenicopterus roseus).

A number of endemic species are found in the spiny forest zones, including 4 species of coua [Giant Coua (Coua gigas), Red-capped Coua (Coua ruficeps), Running Coua (Coua cursor) and Verreaux's Coua (Coua verreauxi)]. A few of the other endemic birds confirmed here are: Madagascar Sparrowhawk (Accipiter madagascariensis), Greater Vasa Parrot (Coracopsis vasa), Archbold's Newtonia (Newtonia archboldi), Lafresnaye's Vanga (Xenopirostris xenopirostris), Sickle-billed Vanga (Falculea palliata), Thamnornis (Thamnornis chloropetoides), Littoral Rock-thrush (Monticola imerina) and Sakalava Weaver (Ploceus sakalava).

=== Reptiles and Amphibians ===
Although dry, there are a few amphibians found here and almost 40 species of reptiles. Reptiles endemic to the ecoregion include the chameleons (Furcifer belalandaensis and Furcifer antimena). The spider tortoise (Pyxis arachnoides), and the radiated tortoise (Geochelone radiata) can be found in the area along with Dumeril's ground boa (Acrantophis dumerilii) and some rock dwelling iguanids such as marked Madagascar swift (Oplurus saxicola) and Madagascar blue iguana (Oplurus fihereniensis), the day gecko Phelsuma breviceps, nocturnal geckos Ebenavia maintimainty and Matoatoa brevipes, and the snake Liophidium chabaudi.

== Flora ==
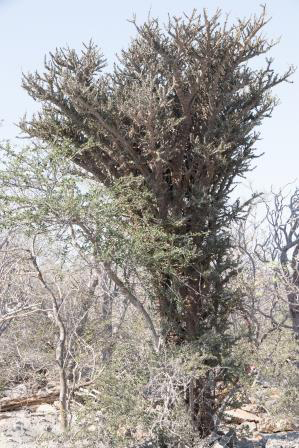
Alluaudia comosa, endemic to southwest Madagascar

As the area with the highest level of plant endemism in Madagascar, with 48% of the genera and 95% of the species endemic, the vascular plants here are diverse and unique. There are many xerophytic and drought tolerant woody species of the spurge family (Euphorbiaceae) such as silver thicket (Euphorbia stenocalda). Several members of the narrowly-endemic Didiereoideae are common here including octopus tree (Didierea madagascariensis) and compass tree (Alluaudia comosa). Botanical inventory of the region that would become Tsimanampetsotsa National Park began with collections by Perrier de la Bâthie in 1910. Many botanists have visited the site and over 200 species of vascular plants from 70 families are documented here. Eleven rare species are known only from Tsimanampetsotse or nearby, and another seven rare species found here are known from five or fewer sites.

The following table lists the species known only from Tsimanampetsotsa NP and nearby areas:

Plant species found only in Tsimanampetsotse National Park and area
| Family | Species |
|---|---|
| Acanthaceae | Achyrocalyx gossypinus |
| Acanthaceae | Anisotes divaricatus |
| Acanthaceae | Ecbolium humbertii |
| Acanthaceae | Hypoestes cinerascens |
| Apocynaceae | Secamone pedicellaris |
| Asteraceae | Helichrysum mahafaly |
| Didiereaceae | Alluaudia montagnacii |
| Fabaceae | Delonix edulis |
| Meliaceae | Calodecaryia pauciflora |
| Moraceae | Ficus humbertii |
| Talinaceae | Talinella microphylla |
