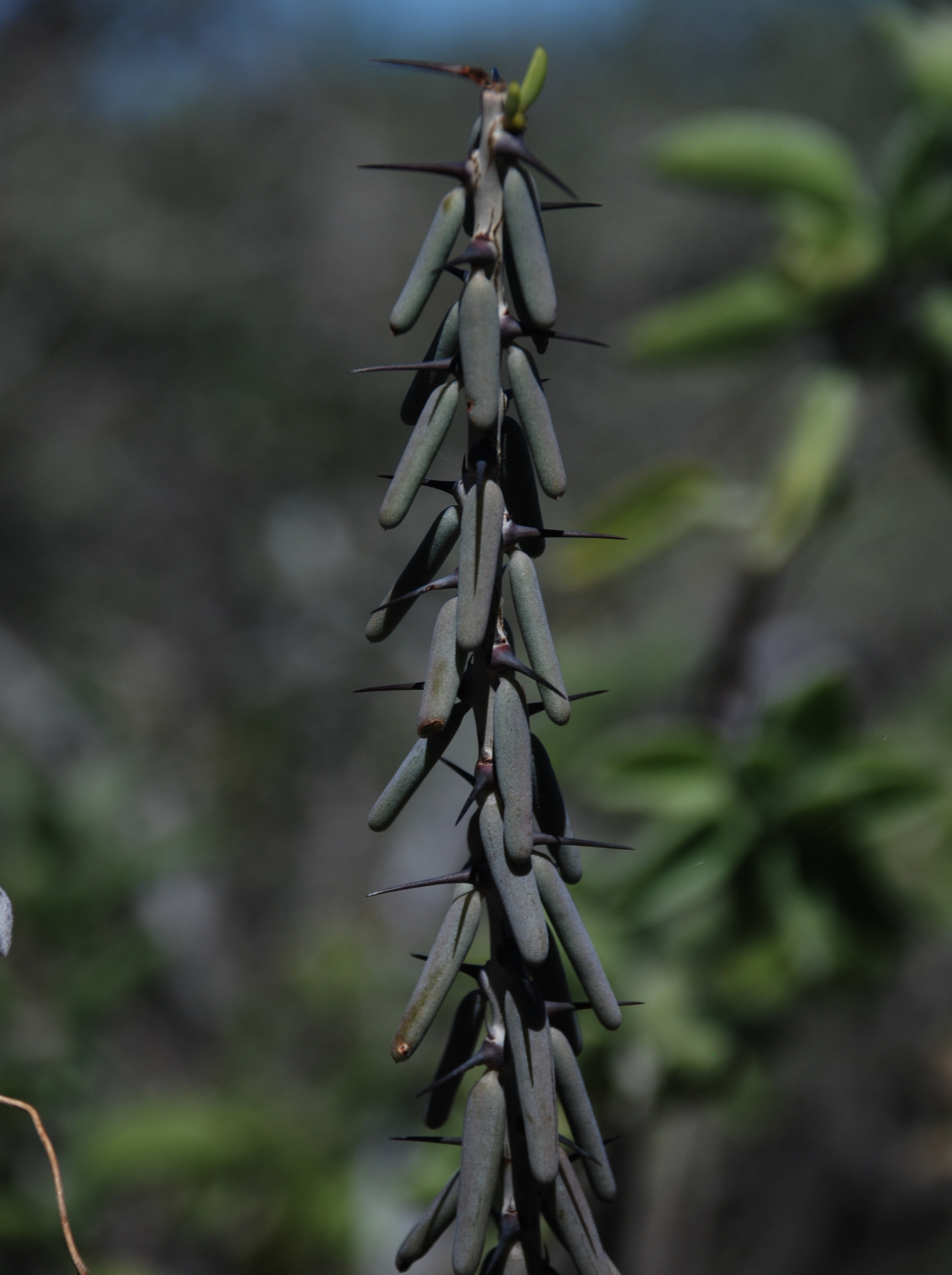

Scientific classification
- Kingdom: Plantae
- Clade: Tracheophytes
- Clade: Angiosperms
- Clade: Eudicots
- Order: Caryophyllales
- Family: Didiereaceae
- Genus: Alluaudiopsis; Humbert & Choux

= Alluaudiopsis =

Genus of flowering plants

Alluaudiopsis is a genus of shrubby flowering plants belonging to the family Didiereaceae. Species of Alluaudiopsis are dioecious, with male and female flowers on separate plants.

Its native range is Southern Madagascar.

Species:

- Alluaudiopsis fiherenensis Humbert & Choux
- Alluaudiopsis marnieriana Rauh
