= Dicraeopetalum =

Scientific classification
- Kingdom: Plantae
- Clade: Tracheophytes
- Clade: Angiosperms
- Clade: Eudicots
- Clade: Rosids
- Order: Fabales
- Family: Fabaceae
- Subfamily: Faboideae
- Tribe: Sophoreae
- Genus: Dicraeopetalum; Harms (1902)

Species
- Dicraeopetalum capuronianum (M.Peltier) Yakovlev; Dicraeopetalum mahafaliense (M.Peltier) Yakovlev; Dicraeopetalum stipulare Harms

Synonyms
- Lovanafia M. Peltier (1972)

Genus of legumes

Dicraeopetalum is a genus of flowering plants in the family Fabaceae. It includes three species native to Ethiopia, Somalia, Kenya, and Madagascar.

== Species ==
Dicraeopetalum comprises the following species:

- Dicraeopetalum capuronianum (M. Peltier) Yakovlev – southern and southwestern Madagascar
- Dicraeopetalum mahafaliense (M. Peltier) Yakovlev – southern Madagascar
- Dicraeopetalum stipulare Harms – southeastern Ethiopia, Somalia, and northeastern Kenya
