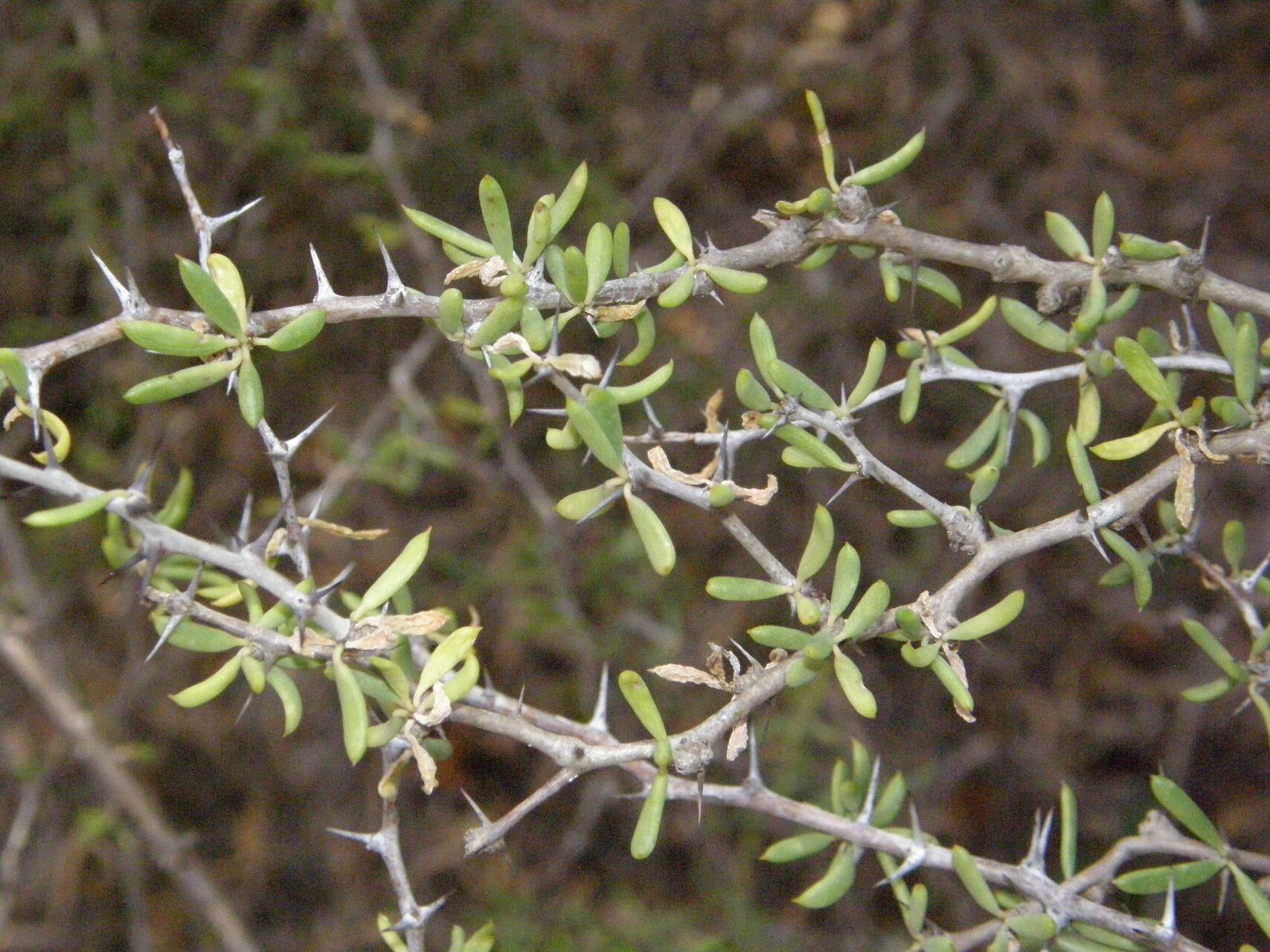

Conservation status
- Least Concern (IUCN 3.1)

Scientific classification
- Kingdom: Plantae
- Clade: Tracheophytes
- Clade: Angiosperms
- Clade: Eudicots
- Order: Caryophyllales
- Family: Didiereaceae
- Genus: Alluaudiopsis
- Species: A. marnieriana

Binomial name
- Alluaudiopsis marnieriana Rauh

= Alluaudiopsis marnieriana =

Species of plant native to Madagascar

Alluaudiopsis marnieriana is a species of plant in the family Didiereaceae described in 1961.

== Description ==
Alluaudiopsis marnieriana is a spiny shrub growing up to 4 meters tall. Stems are thin, and have clusters of two spines up to 2 inches long. Plants are dioecious, having male and female flowers on different plants. Flowers are pink.
