= Ficus bizanae =

Pondoland fig

Conservation status
- Vulnerable (IUCN 3.1)

Scientific classification
- Kingdom: Plantae
- Clade: Tracheophytes
- Clade: Angiosperms
- Clade: Eudicots
- Clade: Rosids
- Order: Rosales
- Family: Moraceae
- Genus: Ficus
- Subgenus: F. subg. Urostigma
- Species: F. bizanae

Binomial name
- Ficus bizanae Hutch. & Burtt Davy

Species of plant known as the Pondoland fig

The Pondoland fig (Ficus bizanae) is a species of fig that is endemic to the coastal forests of South Africa's Eastern Cape and KwaZulu-Natal provinces, where it is threatened by habitat loss.

Their figs are borne on old wood, in small clusters on stumpy branchlets. Their leaves have entire margins, usually have rounded bases, and sometimes have acuminate tips. It is pollinated by Courtella wasps.

The Heart-leaved fig, Ficus polita, is a similar forest species, but is distributed towards the north.
