= Dicraeopetalum stipulare =

Conservation status
- Vulnerable (IUCN 2.3)

Scientific classification
- Kingdom: Plantae
- Clade: Embryophytes
- Clade: Tracheophytes
- Clade: Spermatophytes
- Clade: Angiosperms
- Clade: Eudicots
- Clade: Rosids
- Order: Fabales
- Family: Fabaceae
- Subfamily: Faboideae
- Genus: Dicraeopetalum
- Species: D. stipulare

Binomial name
- Dicraeopetalum stipulare Harms

Synonyms
- Acosmium stipulare (Harms) Yakovlev

Species of flowering plant

Dicraeopetalum stipulare is a species of flowering plant in the family Fabaceae. It is found in Ethiopia, Kenya, and Somalia. It is threatened by habitat loss.
