= Dicraeopetalum capuronianum =

Conservation status
- Near Threatened (IUCN 3.1)

Scientific classification
- Kingdom: Plantae
- Clade: Tracheophytes
- Clade: Angiosperms
- Clade: Eudicots
- Clade: Rosids
- Order: Fabales
- Family: Fabaceae
- Subfamily: Faboideae
- Genus: Dicraeopetalum
- Species: D. capuronianum

Binomial name
- Dicraeopetalum capuronianum (M. Peltier) Yakovlev.

Synonyms
- Lovanafia capuroniana M. Peltier

Species of legume

Dicraeopetalum capuronianum is a species of flowering plant in the family Fabaceae. It is found only in Madagascar.
