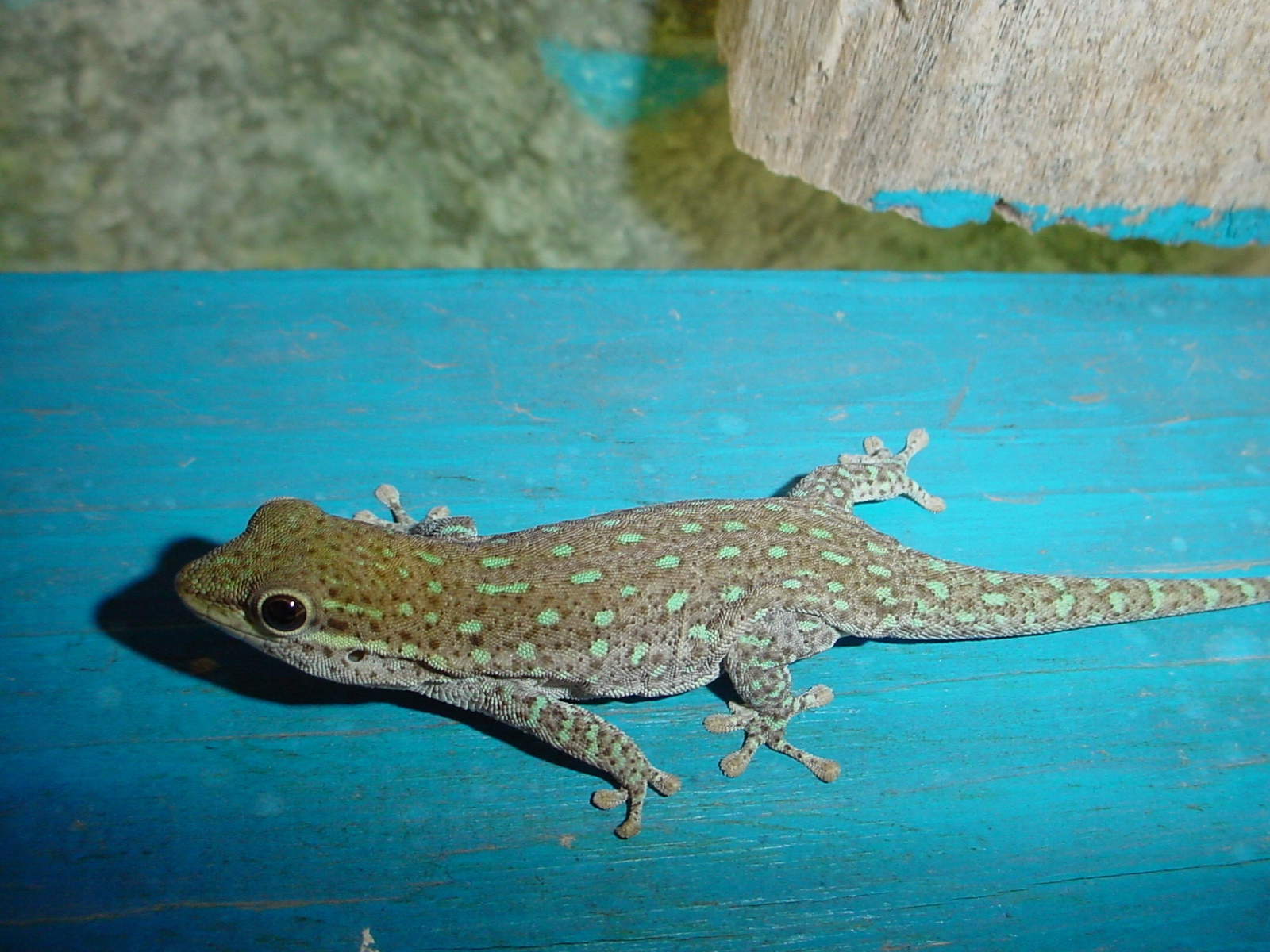

Conservation status
- Vulnerable (IUCN 3.1)

Scientific classification
- Kingdom: Animalia
- Phylum: Chordata
- Class: Reptilia
- Order: Squamata
- Suborder: Gekkota
- Family: Gekkonidae
- Genus: Phelsuma
- Species: P. breviceps

Binomial name
- Phelsuma breviceps Boettger, 1894
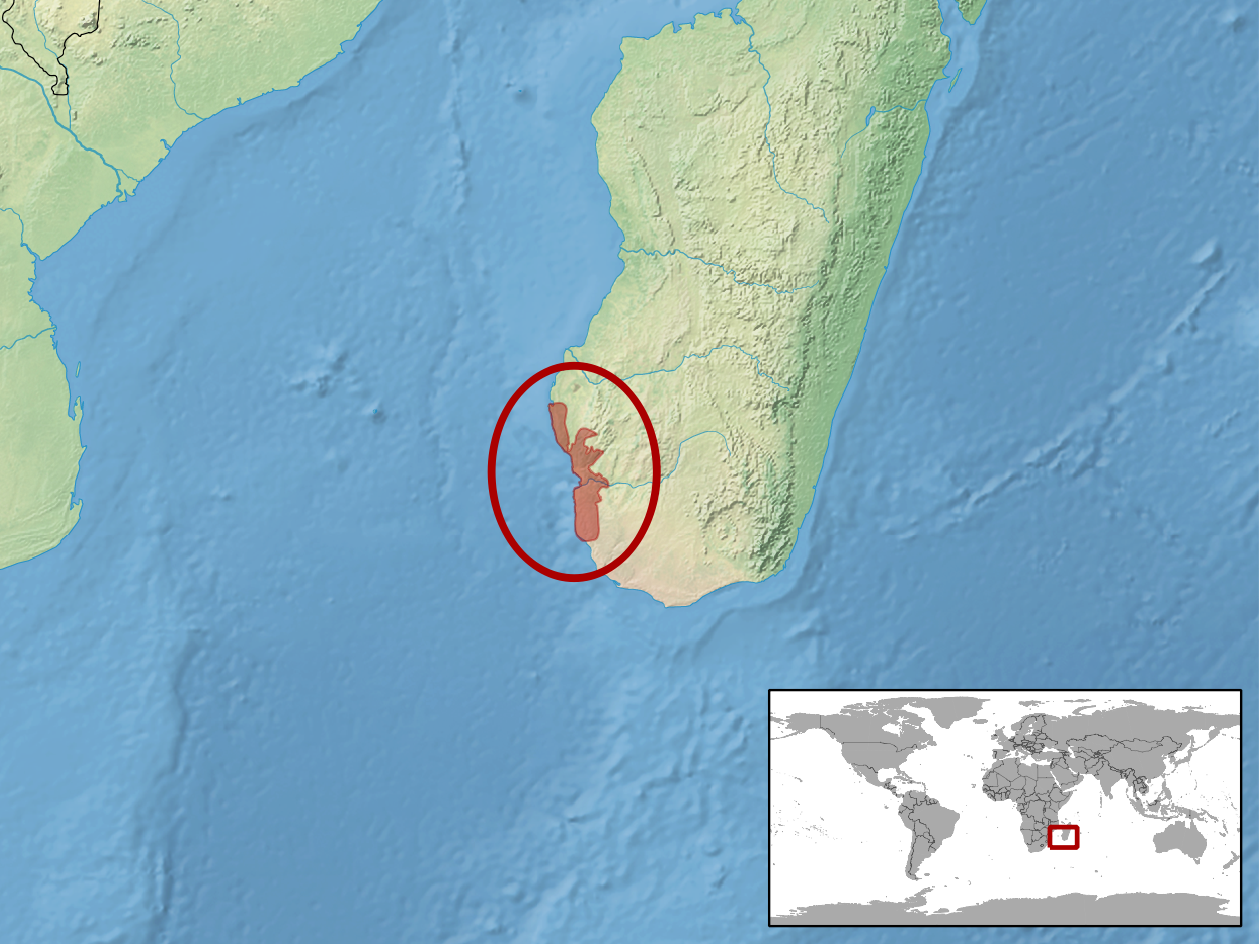

= Phelsuma breviceps =

Species of lizard

Phelsuma breviceps is a diurnal species of gecko that is native to south-west Madagascar and typically dwells on trees and bushes. Its diet in the wild consists mainly of insects.

== Description ==
This lizard belongs to the smallest day geckos. It can reach a maximum total length of about 10 cm. This species is easily recognised by its short snout, after which it has been named. The basic body colour is light grey to brownish. On the back there are light blue and dark dots and stripes. The legs have light blue spots.

== Distribution ==
This species inhabits south-west Madagascar. It is found in the area around Toliara and near the Tsimanampetsotsa-lake.

== Habitat ==
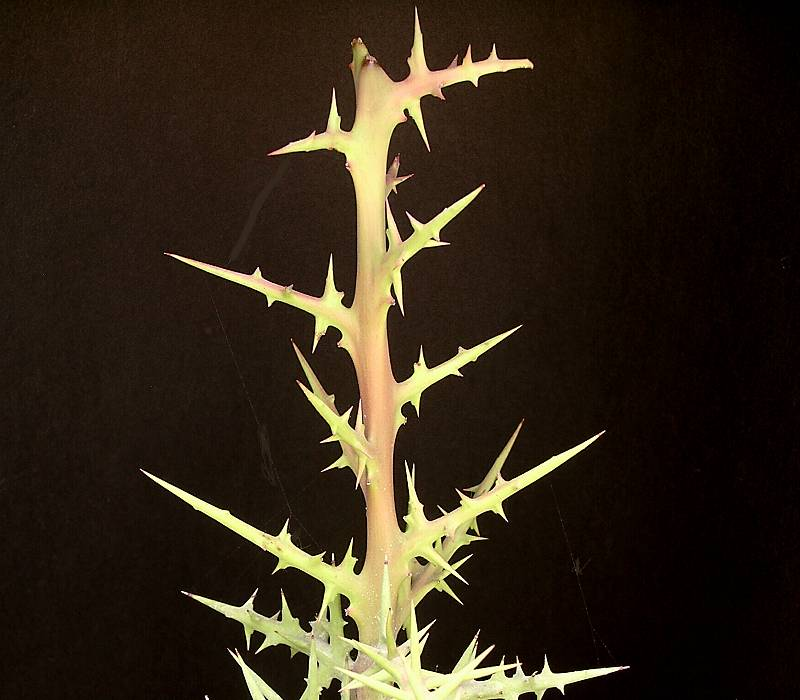
Euphorbia stenoclada

P. breviceps is adapted to a dry climate. It is often found on the succulent spurge Euphorbia stenoclada which has 7 cm long thorns.

== Diet ==
These day geckos feed on various insects, other invertebrates and nectar, both in the wild and in captivity.

== Behaviour ==
Like most geckos of the genus Phelsuma, this species is quite silent.

== Reproduction ==
The females lay their eggs between the wood spurge thorns.

== Care and maintenance in captivity ==
These animals should be housed in pairs and need a dry terrarium. These animals can be fed with crickets, wax moth, fruits flies, mealworms, houseflies and fruit baby food.
