= Dicraeopetalum mahafaliense =

Conservation status
- Least Concern (IUCN 3.1)

Scientific classification
- Kingdom: Plantae
- Clade: Tracheophytes
- Clade: Angiosperms
- Clade: Eudicots
- Clade: Rosids
- Order: Fabales
- Family: Fabaceae
- Subfamily: Faboideae
- Genus: Dicraeopetalum
- Species: D. mahafaliense

Binomial name
- Dicraeopetalum mahafaliense (M. Peltier) Yakovlov.

Synonyms
- Lovanafia mahafaliensis M. Peltier

Species of legume

Dicraeopetalum mahafaliense is a species of flowering plant in the family Fabaceae. It is found only in Madagascar.
