= Androya =

Scientific classification
- Kingdom: Plantae
- Clade: Tracheophytes
- Clade: Angiosperms
- Clade: Eudicots
- Clade: Asterids
- Order: Lamiales
- Family: Scrophulariaceae
- Genus: Androya; H.Perrier (1952)
- Species: A. decaryi

Binomial name
- Androya decaryi H.Perrier (1952)

Genus of plants

Androya is a genus of flowering plants in the family Scrophulariaceae. It is endemic to the southwest of Madagascar.

== Taxonomy ==
It was first described by H.Perrier in 1952.

== Species ==
This taxon only contains one species, Androya decaryi.

== Description ==
This evergreen shrub can be found at elevations between 0 - 499m.

== Uses ==
=== Traditional medicine ===
A decoction of this plant is used to treat symptoms associated with malaria and yellow fever.

== Chemistry ==
Three spermidine alkaloids are known to be present in Androya decaryi. They are (–)-(2S)-2-phenyl-1,5,9-triazacyclotridecan-4-one, (+)-decaryine A and (–)-decaryine B. However, there is no sufficient evidence to suggest that these three chemicals have any significant activity against Plasmodium falciparum.
