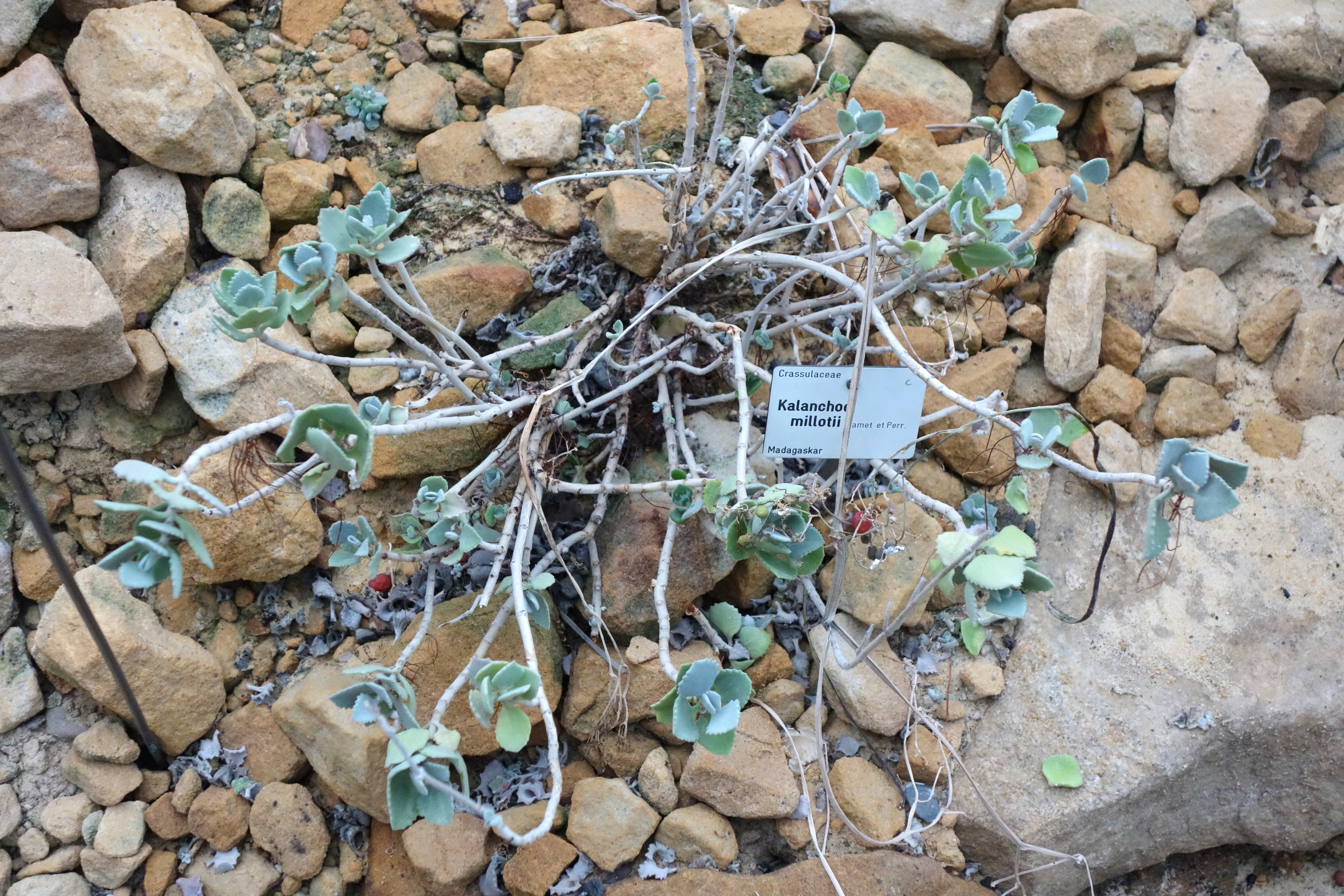

Scientific classification
- Kingdom: Plantae
- Clade: Tracheophytes
- Clade: Angiosperms
- Clade: Eudicots
- Order: Saxifragales
- Family: Crassulaceae
- Genus: Kalanchoe
- Section: Kalanchoe sect. Bryophyllum
- Species: K. millotii

Binomial name
- Kalanchoe millotii Raym.-Hamet & H.Perrier

= Kalanchoe millotii =

Species of succulent

Kalanchoe millotii is a succulent plant that is native south-central and southeastern Madagascar. It forms a shrub up to a foot high. The leaf is a hazy green and scalloped, with dense felt covering it.

It also features yellow-green blooms in loose clusters.

This succulent, like most of its kind, requires porous soil and can only tolerate light frost. The plant is hardy to 2–4 °C (36–39 °F) and needs bright light, or full sun to partial shade.
