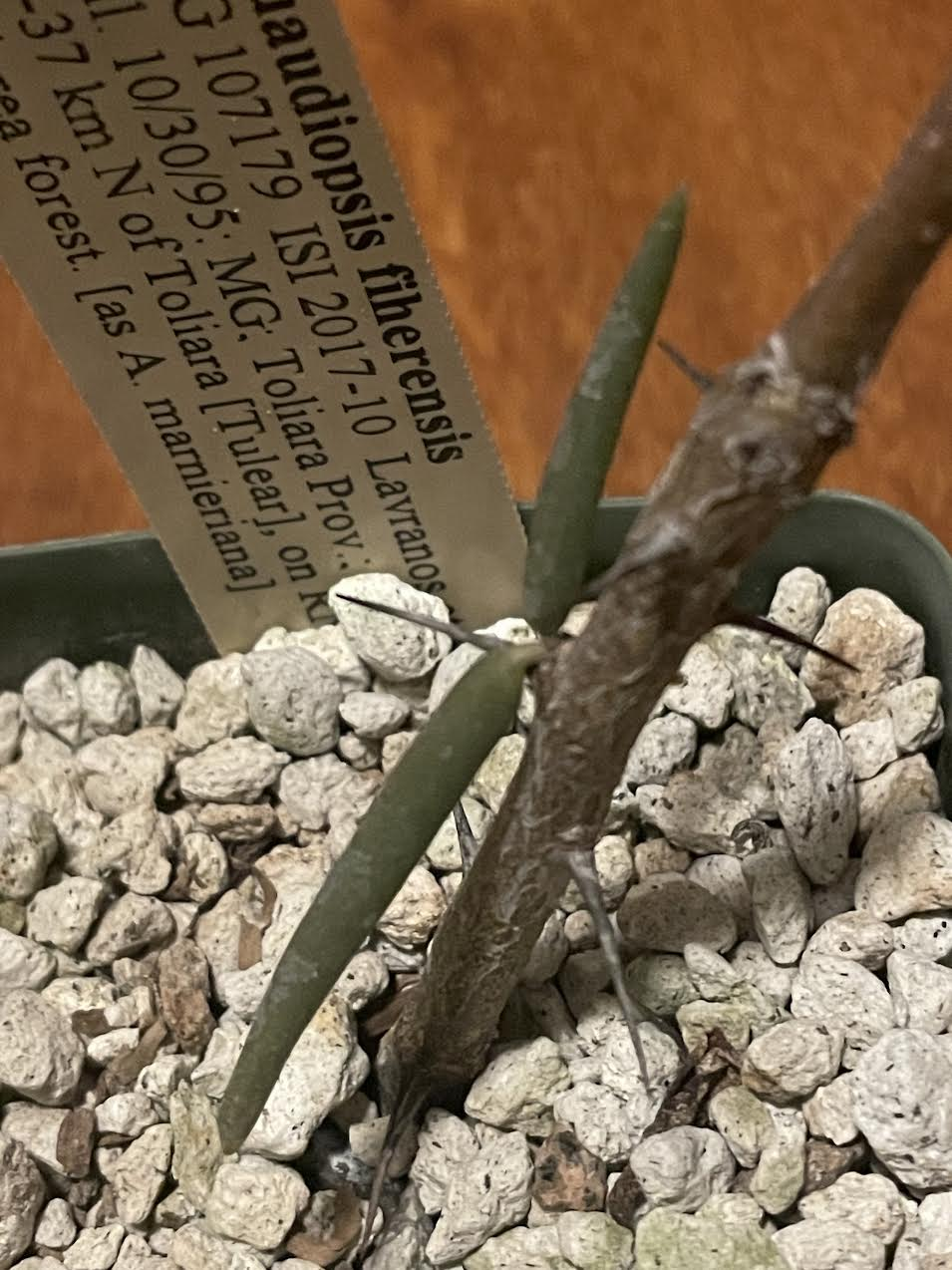
- Alluaudiopsis fiherenensis, misspelled as Alluaudiopsis fiherensis

Scientific classification
- Kingdom: Plantae
- Clade: Tracheophytes
- Clade: Angiosperms
- Clade: Eudicots
- Order: Caryophyllales
- Family: Didiereaceae
- Genus: Alluaudiopsis
- Species: A. fiherenensis

Binomial name
- Alluaudiopsis fiherenensis Humbert & Choux

= Alluaudiopsis fiherenensis =

Species of plant native to Madagascar

Alluaudiopsis fiherenensis is a plant native to the Didiera forests of Madagascar first described in 1934.

== Description ==
Alluaudiopsis fiherenensis is a slow-growing, sprawling plant 1.5 - 2 meters tall that will lose its succulent leaves in the winter. Will branch, and has a white stem with thorns. It is one of two species in the Alluaudiopsis genus.
