= Delonix edulis =

Conservation status
- Endangered (IUCN 3.1)

Scientific classification
- Kingdom: Plantae
- Clade: Tracheophytes
- Clade: Angiosperms
- Clade: Eudicots
- Clade: Rosids
- Order: Fabales
- Family: Fabaceae
- Subfamily: Caesalpinioideae
- Genus: Delonix
- Species: D. edulis

Binomial name
- Delonix edulis (H.Perrier) Babineau & Bruneau (2017)

Synonyms
- Lemuropisum edule H.Perrier (1938 publ. 1939)

Species of legume

Delonix edulis (Malagasy:Tara) is a species of edible wild plant native to southwest Madagascar. The plant grows in semi-arid tropical zones with annual rainfall less than 400 mm, from sea level up to 100 meters elevation.

The plant is classified in subfamily Caesalpinioideae of family Fabaceae. The scientific synonym Lemuropisum edule means edible lemur's pea.

The species is currently under investigation as a potential nut crop in Western Australia.

== Description ==
Unarmed, multistemmed, much branched, spreading shrub up to 4–6 m tall, crown dense, branchlets sometimes spine-like. Leaves sparse, semi-persistent, paripinnate, with 1-4 pairs of oval to suborbicular leaflets, 3.5–6 mm wide. Inflorescence a raceme; flowers bisexual, with 4 white petals and 1 tinged yellow. Flowers are night-opening, with long stamens and a nectariferous upper petal shaped as a narrow tubular claw. Fruit pendent, subcylindric, depressed between the seeds, 20–30 cm long, 2 cm wide, 2-valved, valves membraneous, dehiscent; seeds 6–12, ovoid-reniform, 2.5 cm long, 1.6 cm across, testa thin and brittle. night opening flowers, white petals with long dark stamens and an upper petal with a narrow tubular nectariferous claw

== Range and habitat ==
Delonix edulis is endemic to coastal southwestern Madagascar, where it has a restricted and fragmented range. Its main population is around Itampolo.

It grows in spiny thickets and coastal bushland with species of Alluaudia and succulent Euphorbia on limestone and coastal sand substrates.

The species' night-opening flowers are thought to be pollinated by moths.

The species is threatened with habitat loss from livestock grazing and forest clearance, and from over-harvesting for firewood and charcoal.

== Cultivation ==
Not cultivated in Madagascar. In Australia, after soaking the seeds for 10 hours, germination is rapid. Alkaline soils preferred. Nuts (seeds) are harvested from the ground following dehiscence. Nuts eaten raw, discarding the brittle testa, the cotyledons agreeably sweet with a cashew-like flavour, smooth consistency and a flexible, rather plastic texture. Apparently not used in cooking; when eaten green the flavour is reminiscent of fresh garden peas.

== Nutritional value ==
The nuts contain 38-43% available carbohydrates, 26-32% unavailable carbohydrates, 14-16% protein and 6-9% fat, comparing favourably with those of Cordeauxia edulis. However, the ingestion of 100 g kernels, ca. 84 raw seeds, may inhibit human production of chymotrypsin and cause digestive upsets, although this could possibly be reduced by cooking or roasting the seeds.
