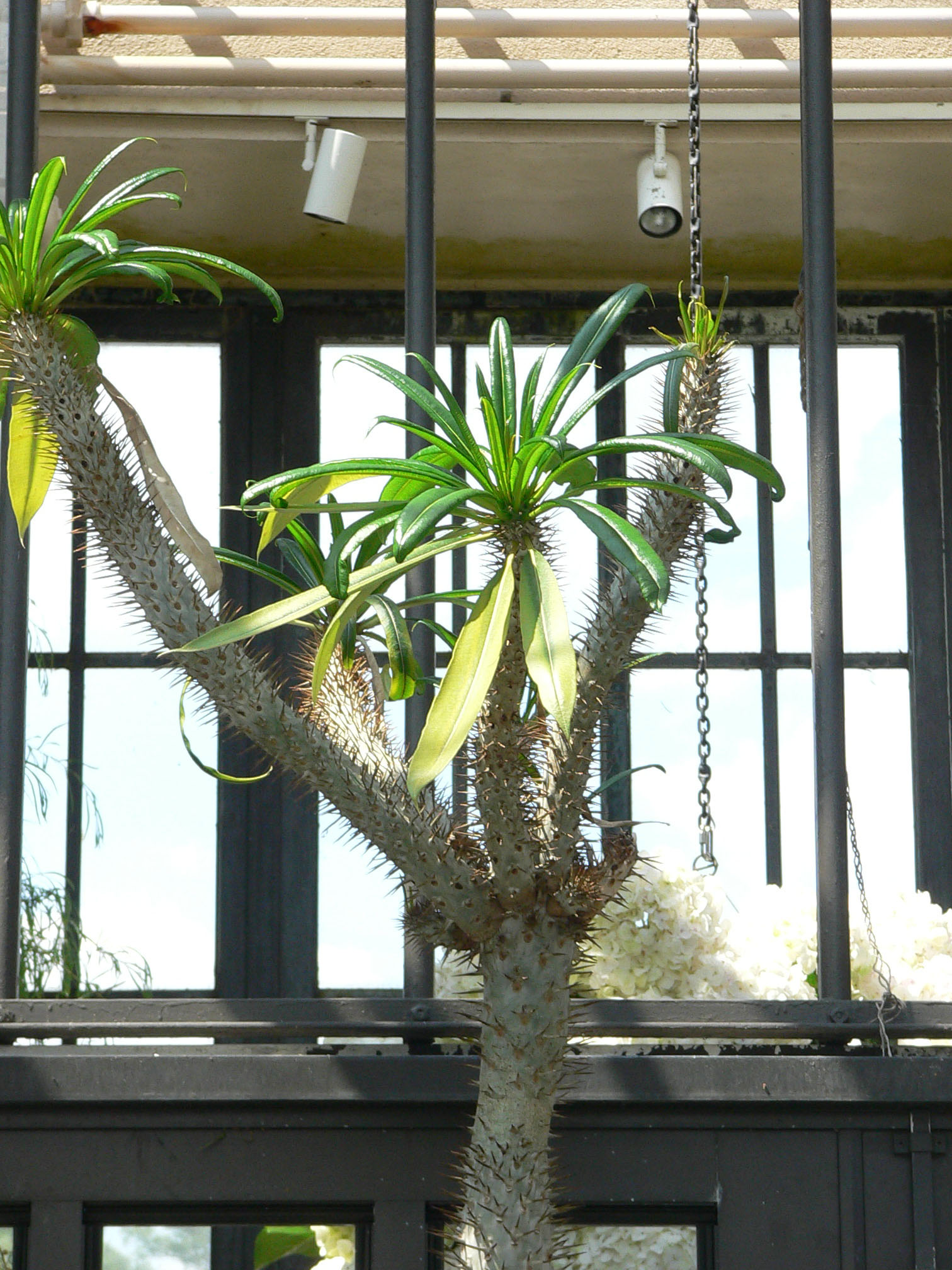
- A Pachypodium in Longwood Gardens

Conservation status
- Least Concern (IUCN 3.1)

Scientific classification
- Kingdom: Plantae
- Clade: Tracheophytes
- Clade: Angiosperms
- Clade: Eudicots
- Clade: Asterids
- Order: Gentianales
- Family: Apocynaceae
- Genus: Pachypodium
- Species: P. geayi

Binomial name
- Pachypodium geayi Costantin & Bois

= Pachypodium geayi =

Species of plant

Pachypodium geayi is a species of Pachypodium in the Dogbane Family (Apocynaceae) that originated from Southwest Madagascar. It has a succulent, metallic grey pachycaul trunk with uniformly spaced thorns, and the leaves are thin and grey-green, with a bright pink mid-rib. The plant has white flowers. Pachypodium geayi is one of the largest of the Madagascar species.

== Gallery ==
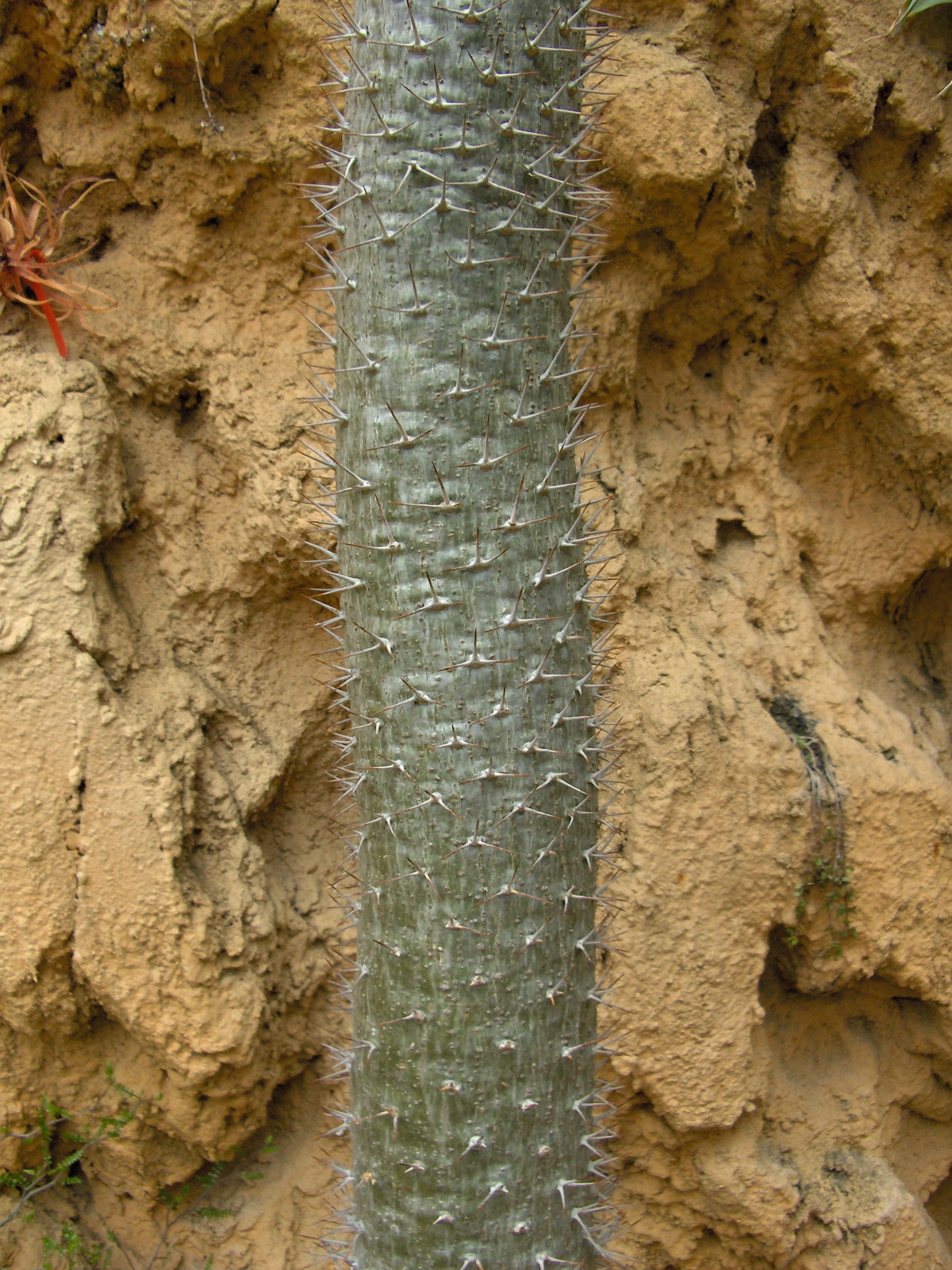
The trunk of Pachypodium geayi

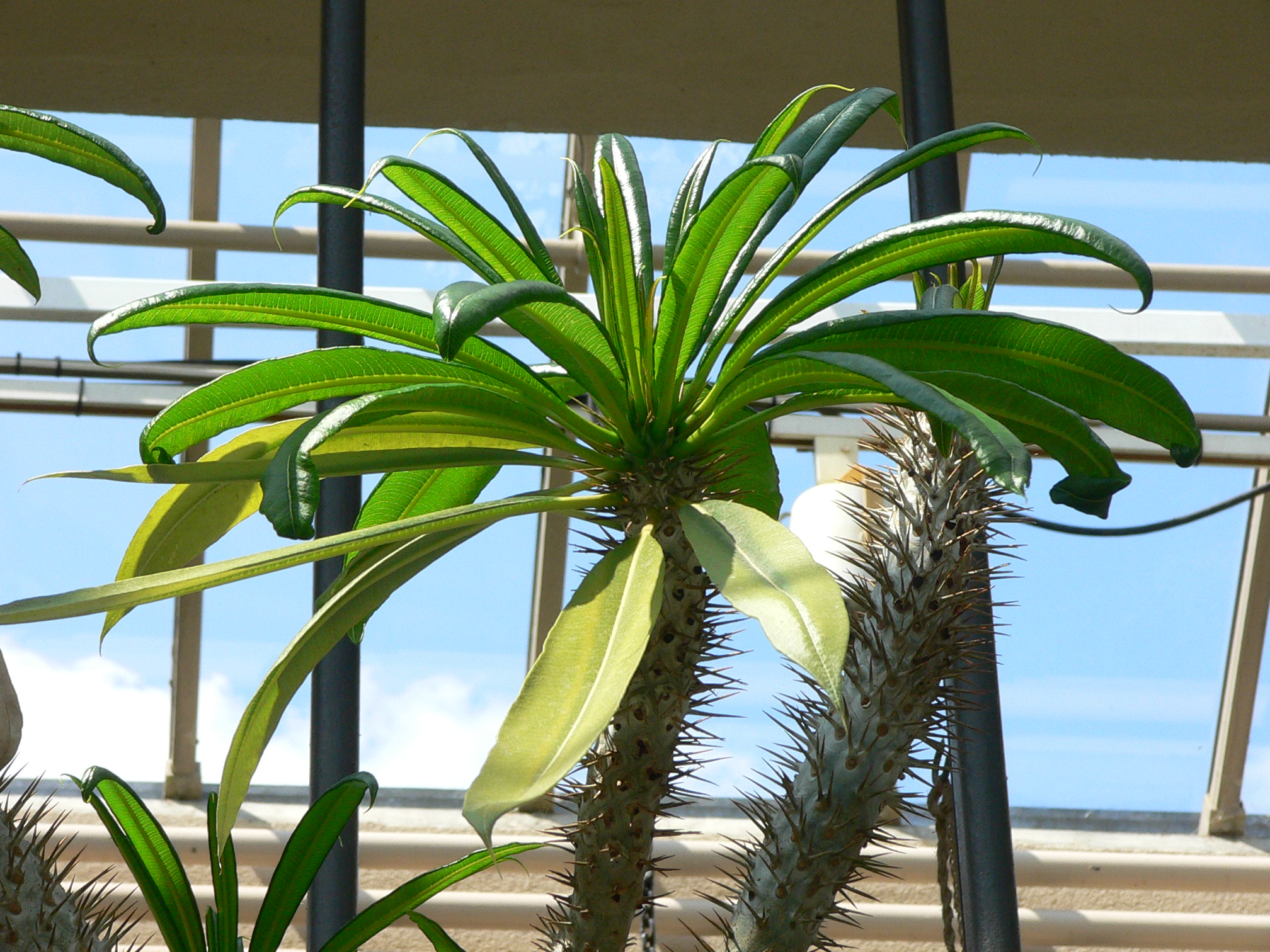

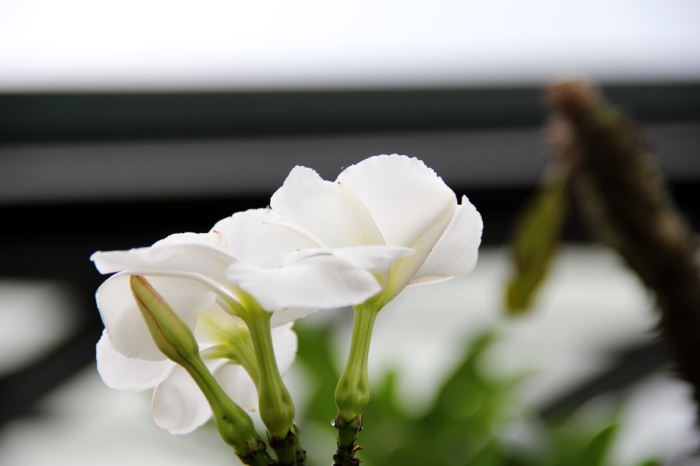
Flower of Pachypodium geayi
