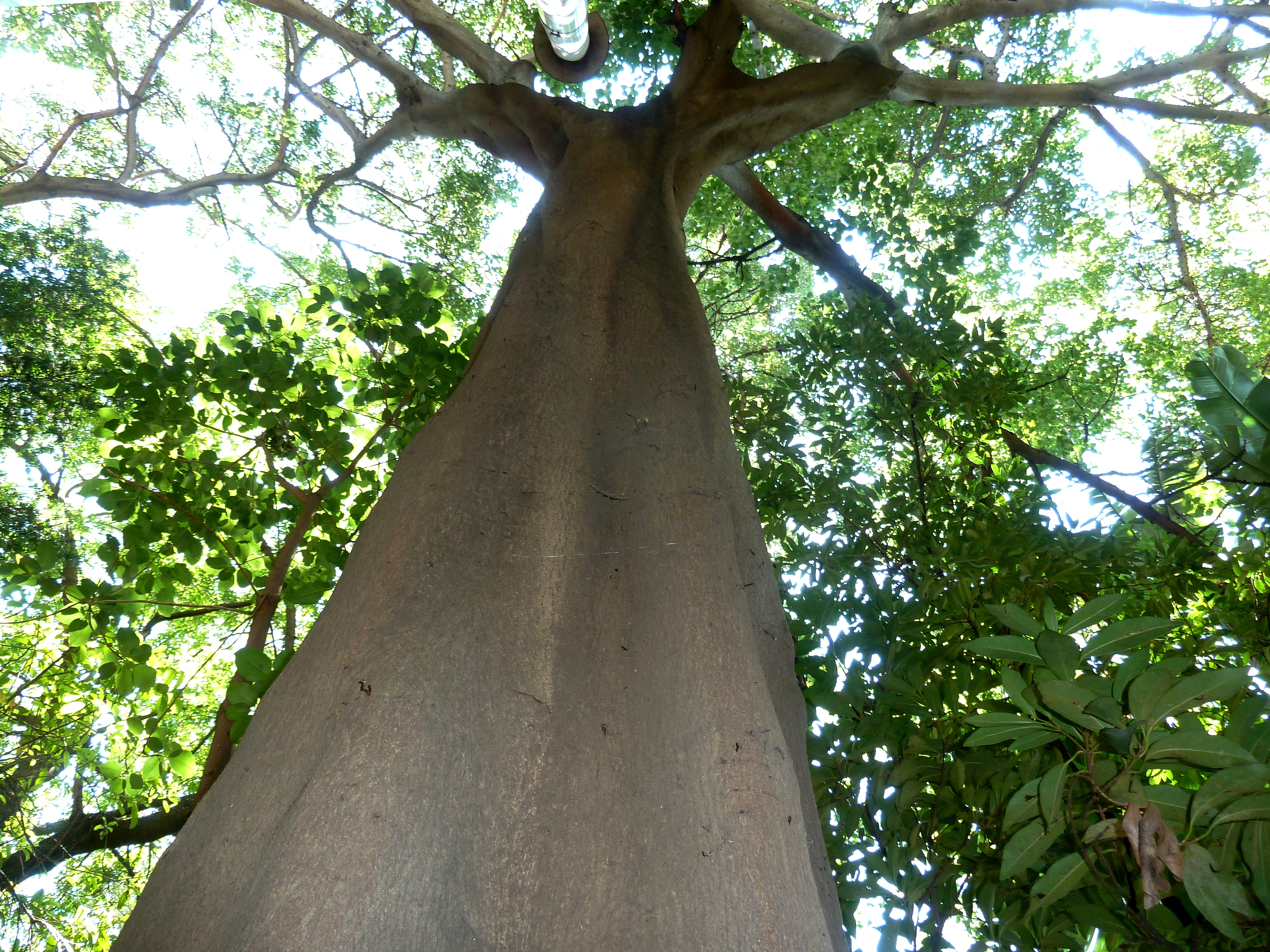
- Specimen in Pretoria, South Africa

Conservation status
- Least Concern (IUCN 3.1)

Scientific classification
- Kingdom: Plantae
- Clade: Tracheophytes
- Clade: Angiosperms
- Clade: Eudicots
- Clade: Rosids
- Order: Rosales
- Family: Moraceae
- Genus: Ficus
- Species: F. polita

Binomial name
- Ficus polita Vahl (1805)

Subspecies
- Ficus polita subsp. brevipedunculata C.C.Berg; Ficus polita subsp. polita

Synonyms
- Urostigma politum (Vahl) Miq.; synonyms of subsp. polita: Ficus barombiensis Warb., nom. illeg. homonym. post.; Ficus megapoda Baker; Ficus niamniamensis Warb.; Ficus podophylla Baker; Ficus syringifolia Warb., nom. illeg. homonym. post.; Ficus umbrosa Sim, nom. illeg. homonym. post.

= Ficus polita =

Species of fig

Ficus polita, the heart-leaved fig, is a species of fig that is native to forests of tropical Africa, ranging from Senegal in the west to South Sudan and Kenya in the east, south to Angola and KwaZulu Natal, and to Madagascar.

== Distribution ==
The tree is found in Lowland rainforest and gallery forest (west and central Africa), coastal & dry forest (east and southern African coast), and on Madagascar. It grows up to elevations of 1,200 metres (3,900 ft).

== Description ==
Ficus polita is similar to the Pondoland fig, (Ficus bizanae), an endemic tropical forest species in South Africa. The leaves have entire margins and are often heart-shaped, with the tip acuminate.

The figs are borne on old wood, in small clusters on stumpy branchlets.

The pollinating wasp is Courtella bekiliensis bekiliensis (Risbec) in Madagascar, and Courtella bekiliensis bispinosa (Wiebes) on the African mainland.

== Gallery ==
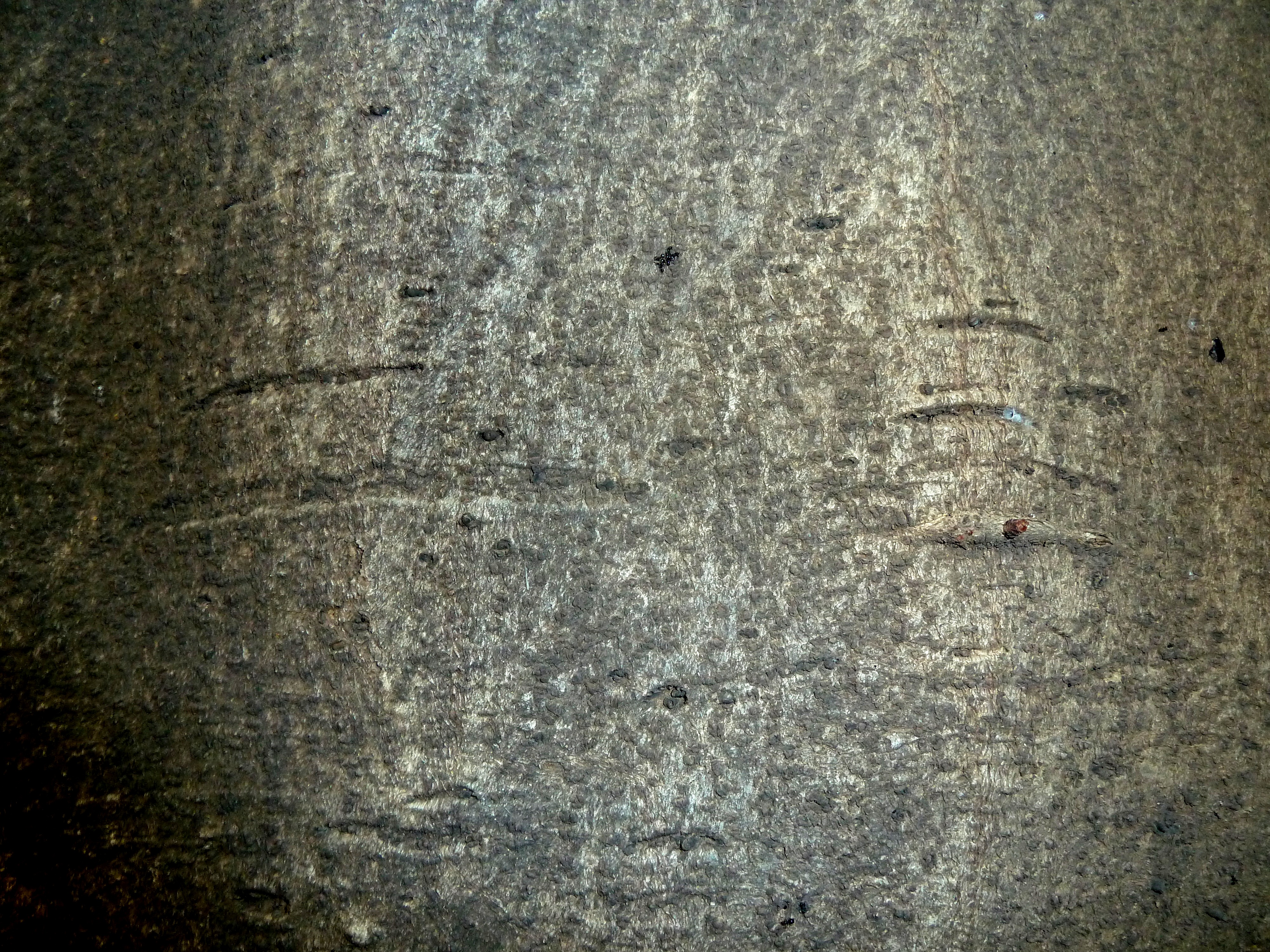
Bark texture

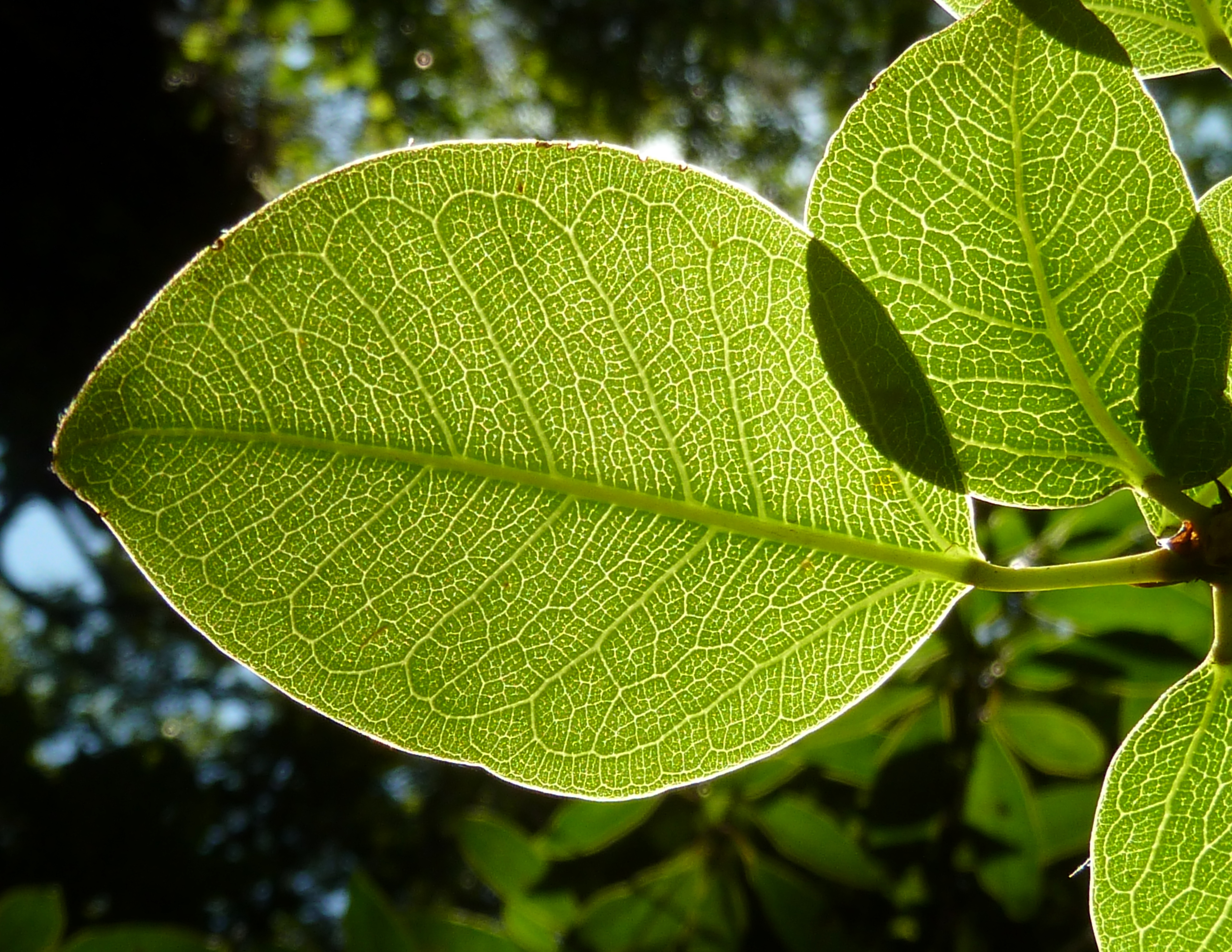
Leaf shape

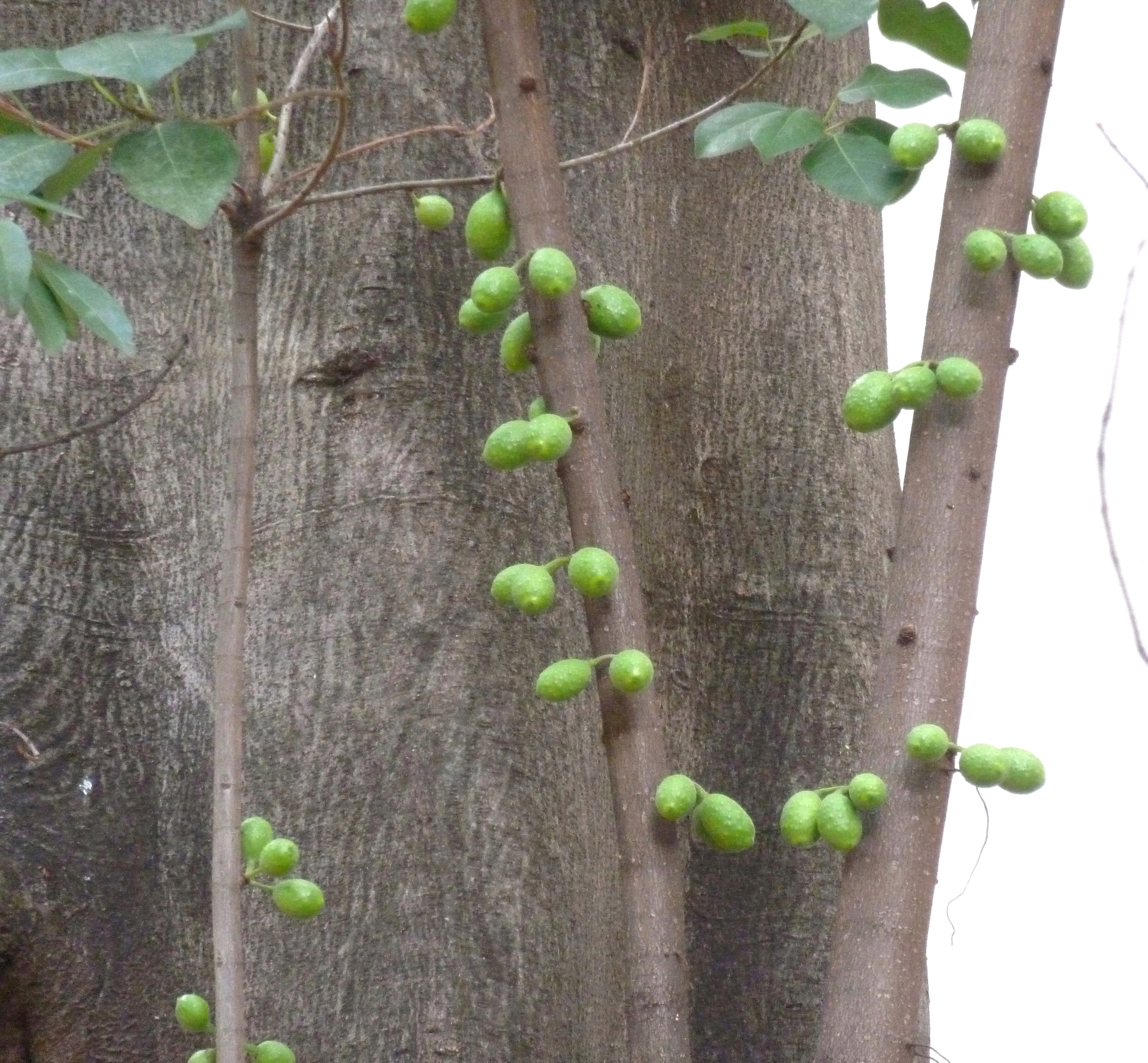
Fig clusters

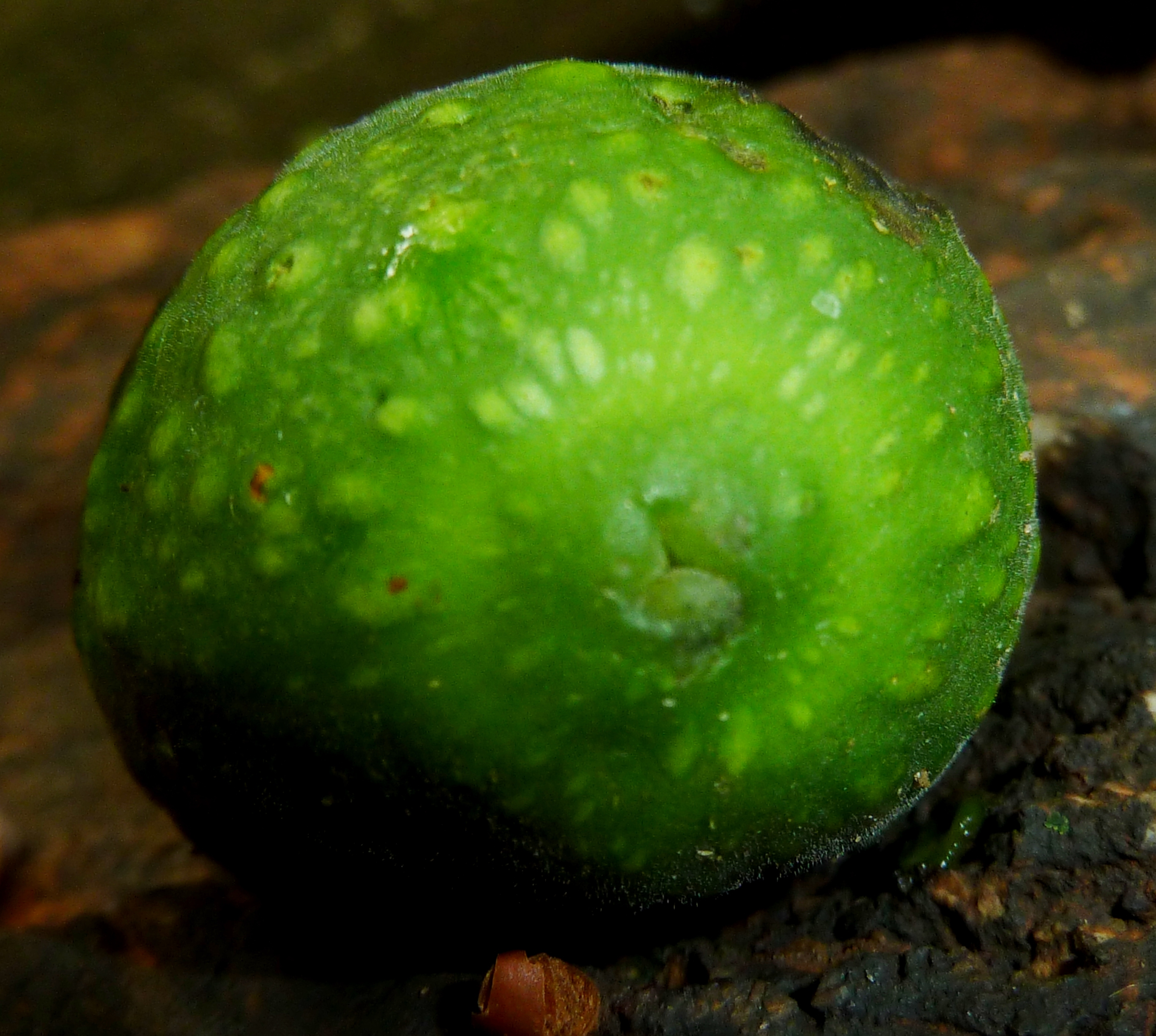
Fig
