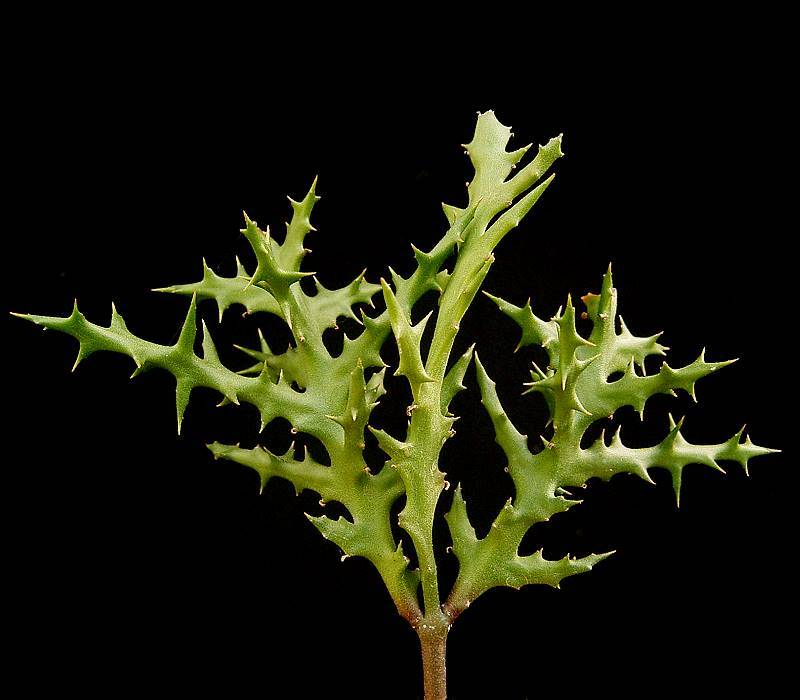
- 2-year-old seedling of subspecies stenoclada

Conservation status
- Least Concern (IUCN 3.1)

Scientific classification
- Kingdom: Plantae
- Clade: Tracheophytes
- Clade: Angiosperms
- Clade: Eudicots
- Clade: Rosids
- Order: Malpighiales
- Family: Euphorbiaceae
- Genus: Euphorbia
- Species: E. stenoclada

Binomial name
- Euphorbia stenoclada Baill.

= Euphorbia stenoclada =

Species of tree

Euphorbia stenoclada is a species of plant in the family Euphorbiaceae. It is native to Madagascar and the Mozambique Channel Islands (Europa Island). Its natural habitats are subtropical or tropical dry forests, subtropical or tropical dry shrubland, and rocky areas. It is threatened by habitat loss.

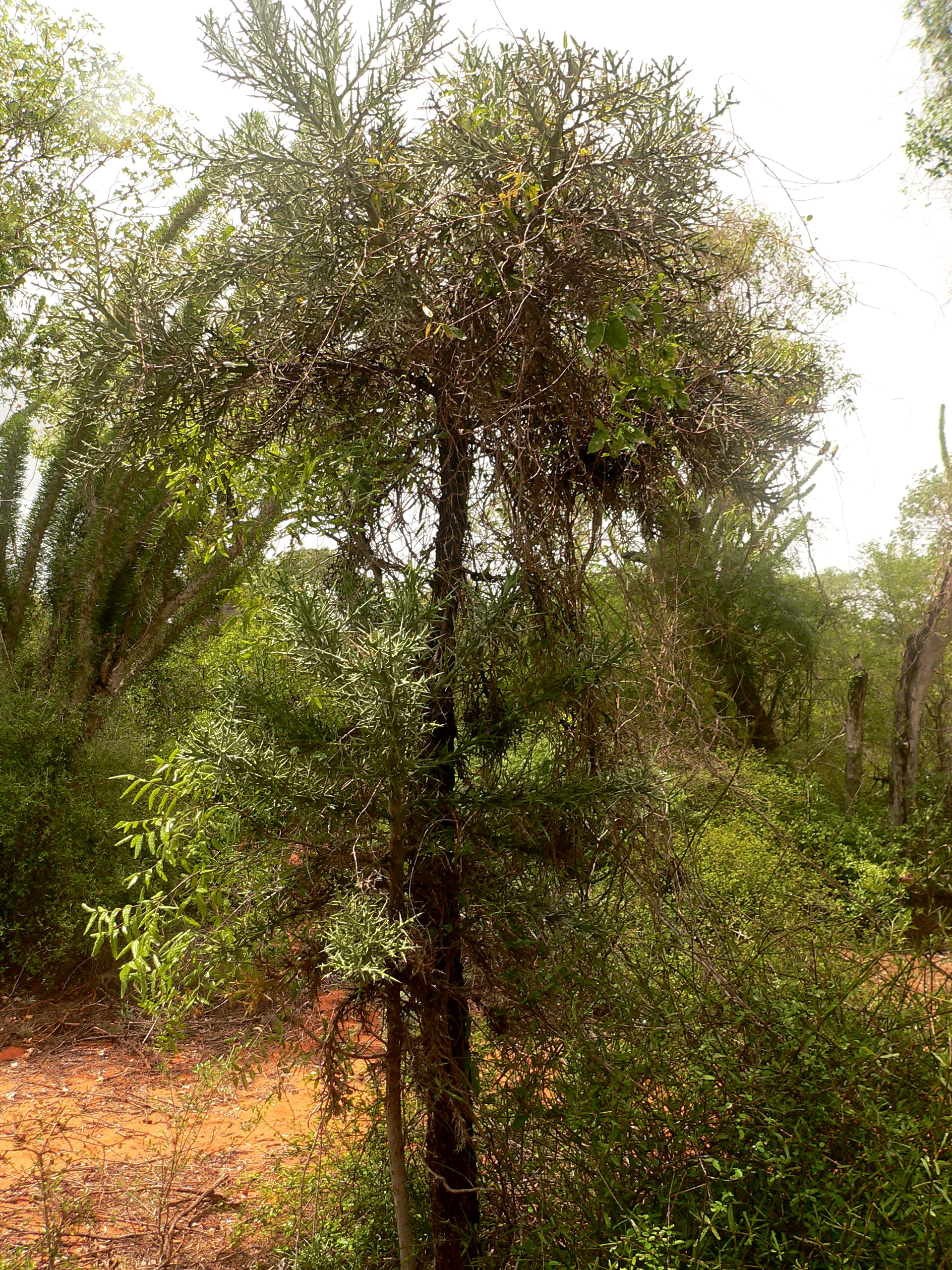
Euphorbia stenoclada in Madagascar spiny forests habitat near Mangily in western Madagascar.
