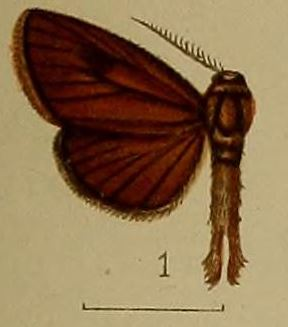
- Indarbela theivora

Scientific classification
- Kingdom: Animalia
- Phylum: Arthropoda
- Class: Insecta
- Order: Lepidoptera
- Family: Cossidae
- Subfamily: Metarbelinae
- Genus: Indarbela; T. B. Fletcher, 1922

Synonyms
- Arbela Moore, 1879 (preocc.); Lepidarbela von Dalla Torre & Strand, 1923

= Indarbela =

Genus of moths

Indarbela is a genus of moths in the family Metarbelidae described by Thomas Bainbrigge Fletcher in 1922.

== Description ==
Species of the genus have minute palpi. Its antennae are bipectinated (comb like on both sides) to the tips in males, the branches short and simple in females. Mid and hind tibia slightly hairy, with minute terminal pairs of spurs. Forewings with veins 7, 8 and 9 stalked together. Hindwings with the cell of normal length. Vein 6 given off below the angle. Vein 8 connected with the subcostal nervure by an oblique bar near center of cell.

== Species ==
- Indarbela campbelli Hampson, 1910
- Indarbela dea Swinhoe, 1890
- Indarbela discipuncta Wileman, 1915
- Indarbela magma de Joannis, 1929
- Indarbela manes Druce, 1898
- Indarbela millemaculata Hampson, 1897
- Indarbela minima Hampson, 1910
- Indarbela naida Dyar, 1913
- Indarbela nais Druce, 1898
- Indarbela necreros Dyar, 1914
- Indarbela norax Druce, 1898
- Indarbela obliquifasciata Mell, 1923
- Indarbela orima Druce, 1906
- Indarbela pardicolor Moore, 1879
- Indarbela phaga Swinhoe, 1894
- Indarbela quadrinotata Walker, 1856
- Indarbela salara Druce, 1900
- Indarbela tacita Druce, 1898
- Indarbela tegula Distant, 1897
- Indarbela tesselatus Moore, 1879
- Indarbela tetraonis Moore, 1879
- Indarbela theivora Hampson, 1910
- Indarbela watsoni Hampson, 1900

== Former species ==
- Indarbela acutistriata Mell, 1923
- Indarbela disciplaga Swinhoe, 1901
- Indarbela flavina Mell, 1923
- Indarbela kinabalua Holloway, 1976
- Indarbela philobia Druce, 1898
