= Arbela (bug) =

Scientific classification
- Kingdom: Animalia
- Phylum: Arthropoda
- Clade: Pancrustacea
- Class: Insecta
- Order: Hemiptera
- Suborder: Heteroptera
- Family: Nabidae
- Genus: Arbela; Stål, 1866

Genus of true bugs

Arbela is a genus of bugs in the family Nabidae.

There are presently approx. 20 species in this genus, most of them from the Oriental region and 3 species from Africa.

== Species ==
Some species of this genus are:

- Arbela acutistriata Mell 1923
- Arbela baibarana Matsumura 1927
- Arbela carayoni Kerzhner, 1986 (Africa)
- Arbela confusa Harris, 1938 (Africa)
- Arbela costalis Stål, 1873
- Arbela elegantula Stål 1866 (Africa)
- Arbela formosana Matsumura 1921
- Arbela hibisci Esaki & Ishihara 1943
- Arbela lemkaminensis Kerzhner 1970
- Arbela limbata Kerzhner 1970
- Arbela nitidula Stal
- Arbela obliquifasciata Mell 1923
- Arbela peterseni Kerzhner 1970
- Arbela pulchella Hsiao 1981
- Arbela sophiae Kerzhner 1969
- Arbela szechuana Hsiao 1964
- Arbela tabida (Uhler 1896)
- Arbela yunnana Hsiao
