= Naida =

Naida is a given name.

== People with the surname ==
- Naida Angping, Filipina politician
- Naida Cole, Canadian-American concert pianist
- Naida Glavish (born 1946), New Zealand politician
- Naida Kaen (born 1946), American politician
- Naida McCullough (1901–1989), American educator, pianist and composer

== See also ==
- Indarbela naida
- Naidăș
- Nada (given name)
- Nadia (given name)
- Nahia (given name)
