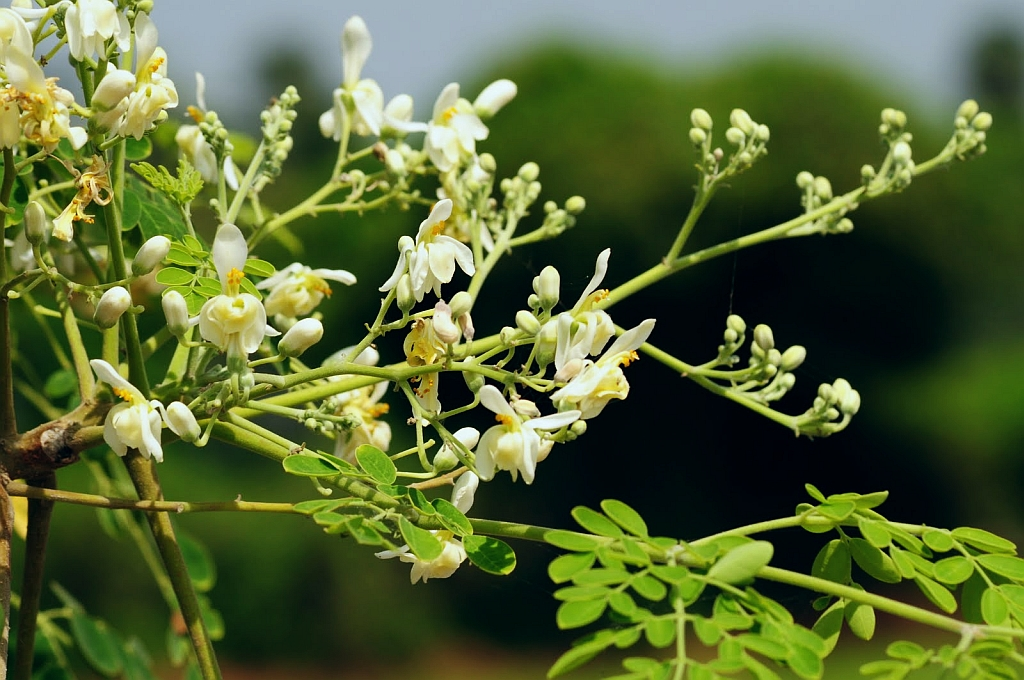

Conservation status
- Least Concern (IUCN 3.1)

Scientific classification
- Kingdom: Plantae
- Clade: Tracheophytes
- Clade: Angiosperms
- Clade: Eudicots
- Clade: Rosids
- Order: Brassicales
- Family: Moringaceae
- Genus: Moringa
- Species: M. oleifera

Binomial name
- Moringa oleifera Lam.

Synonyms
- List: Guilandina moringa L.; Anoma moringa (L.) Lour.; Hyperanthera moringa (L.) Vahl; Hyperanthera decandra Willd.; Moringa amara Durin; Moringa domestica Buch.-Ham.; Moringa edulis Medik.; Moringa erecta Salisb.; Moringa nux-eben Desf.; Moringa octogona Stokes; Moringa polygona DC.; Moringa robusta Bojer; Moringa sylvestris Buch.-Ham.; Moringa zeylanica Pers.

= Moringa oleifera =

Species of flowering tree

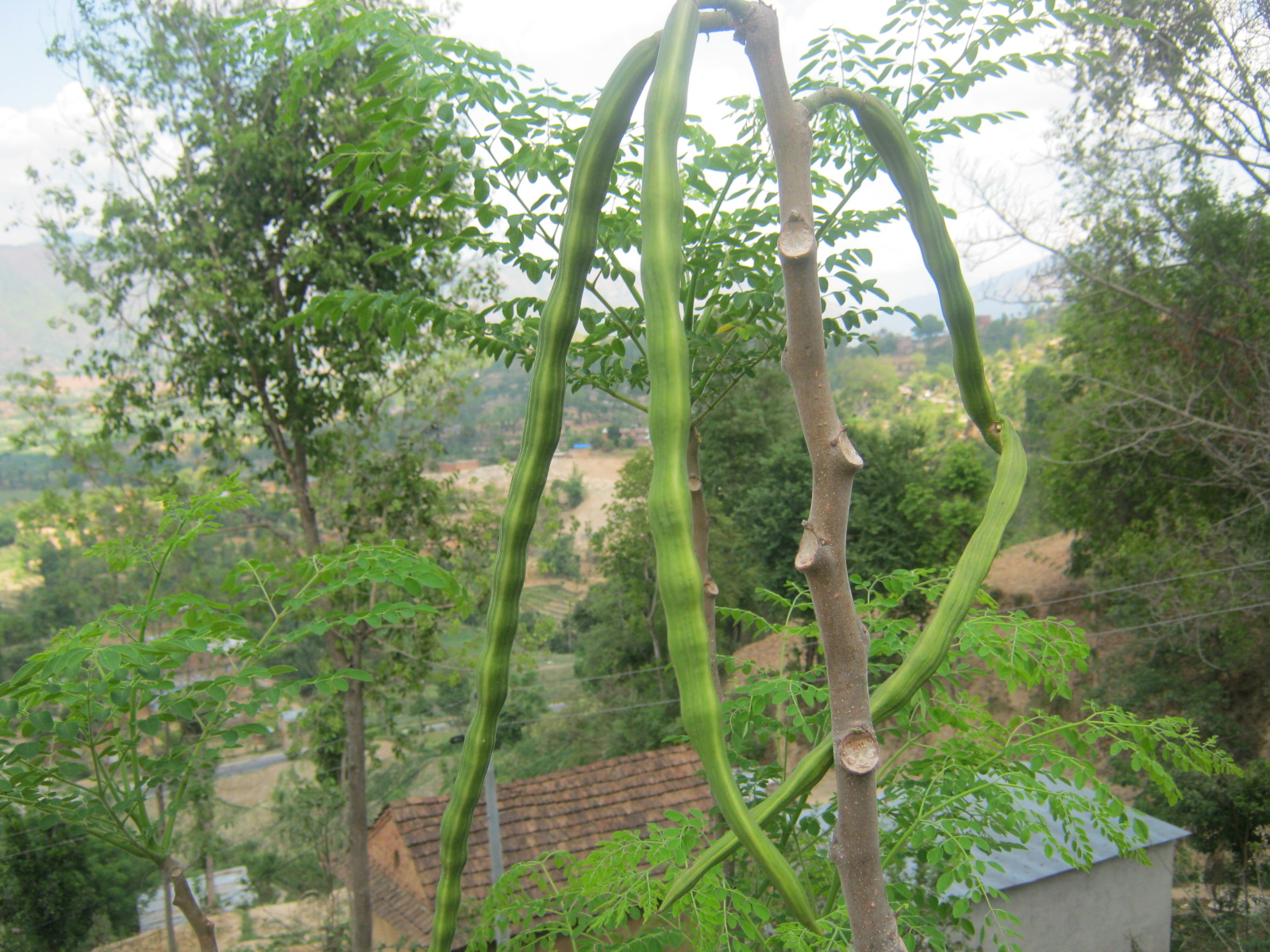
Pods

Moringa oleifera is a short-lived, (Note: ِAccording to a source, the tree's extreme short-lived lifespan is limited to twenty years only) fast-growing, drought-resistant tree of the family Moringaceae, native to northern India and used extensively in South and Southeast Asia. Common names include moringa, drumstick tree (from the long, slender, triangular seed-pods), horseradish tree (from the taste of the roots, which resembles horseradish), ben tree (for its oil), or malunggay (as known in maritime or archipelagic areas in Asia).

It is widely cultivated for its young seed pods and leaves, used as vegetables and for traditional medicine. It is also used for water purification.

== Description ==
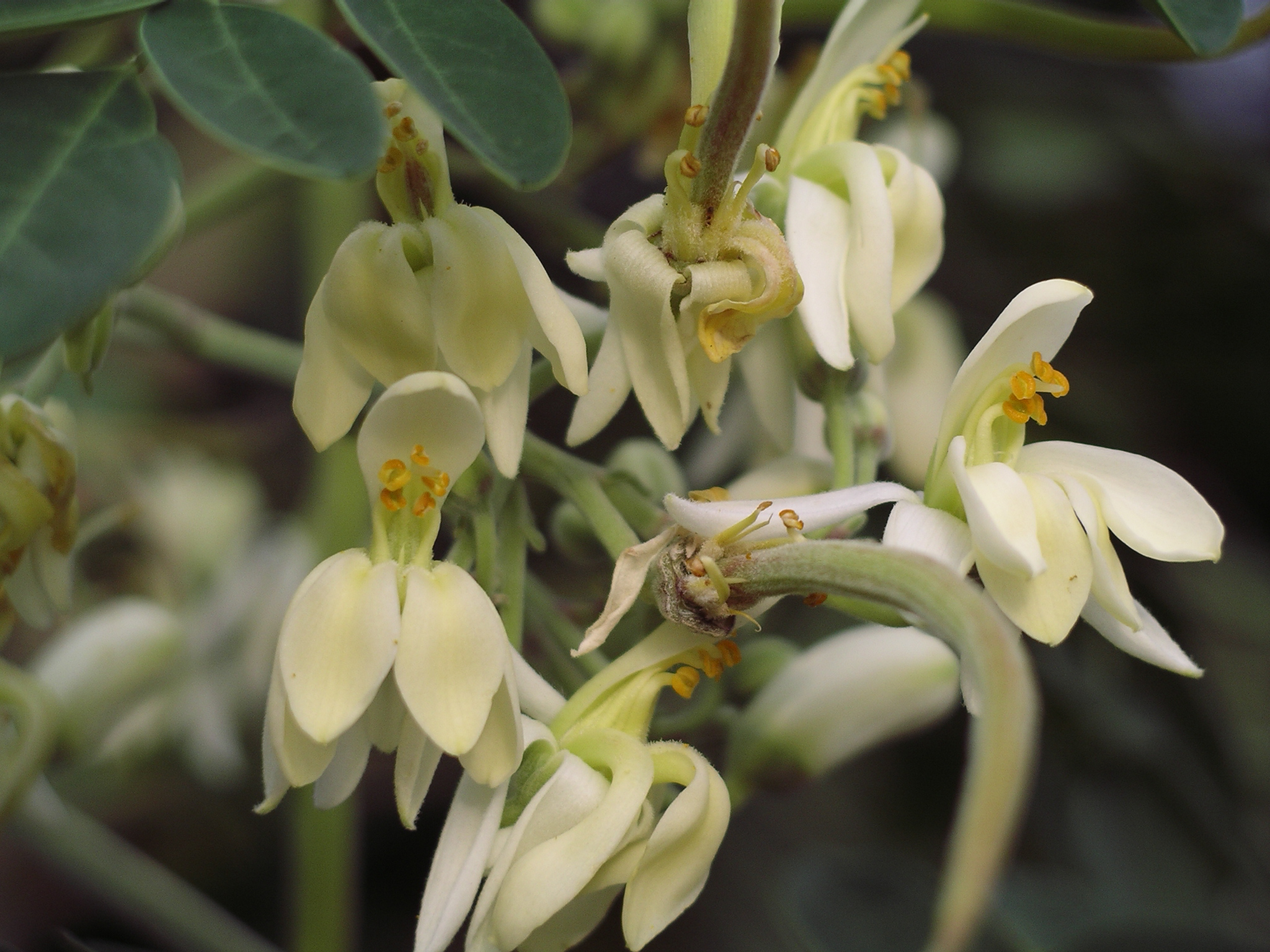
Moringa flowers

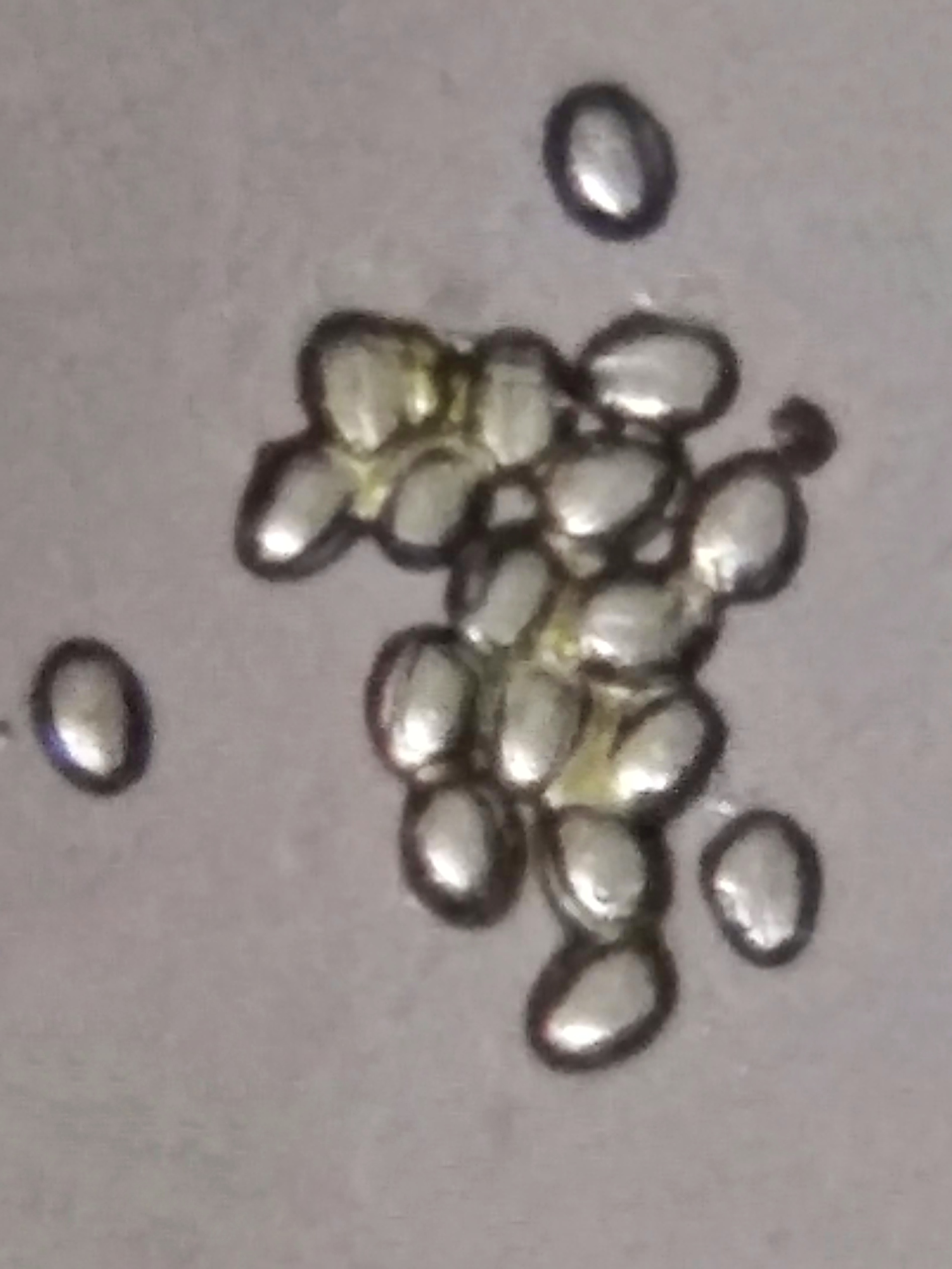
Moringa pollen

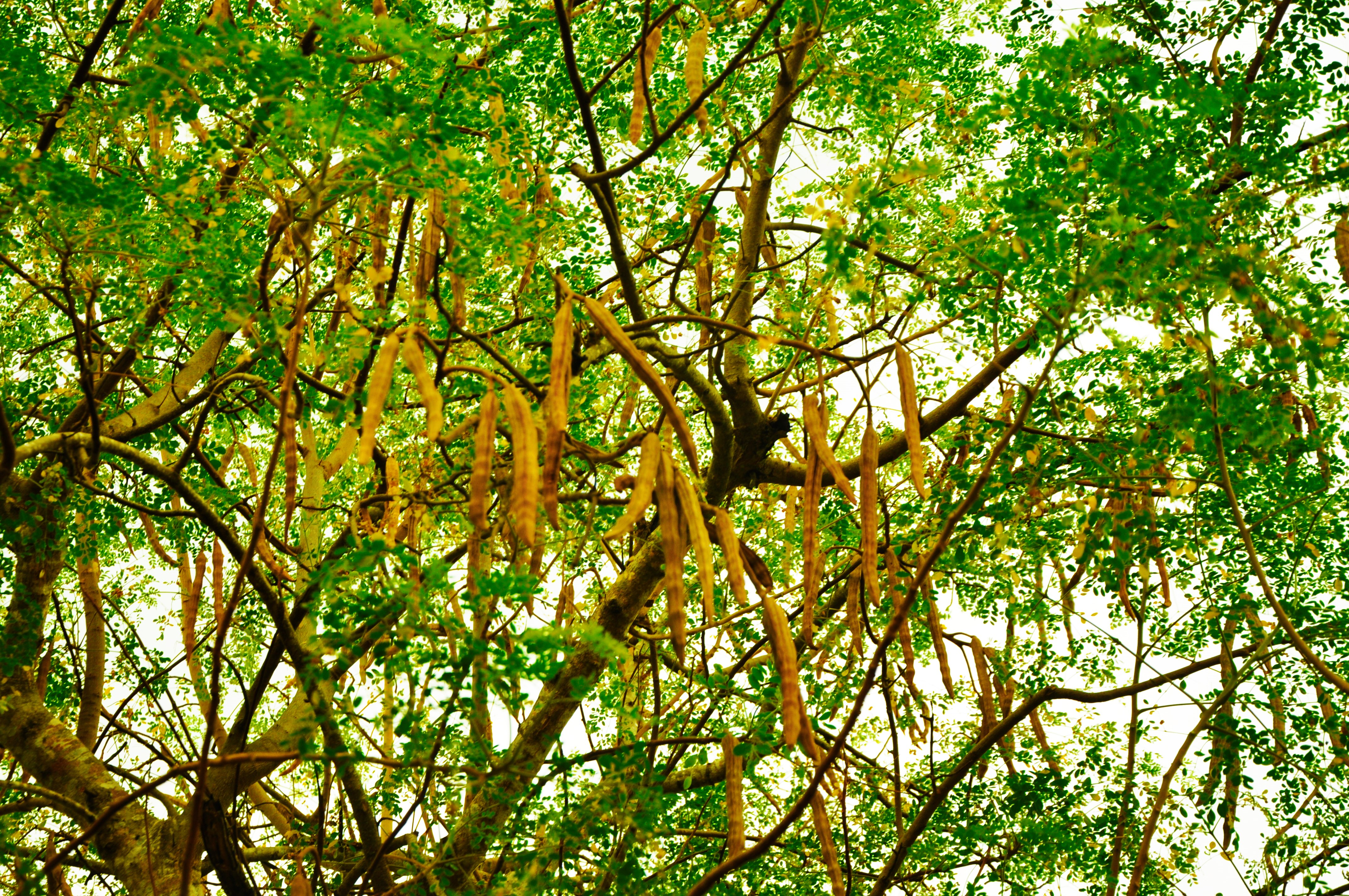
Tree and seed pods of Moringa oleifera

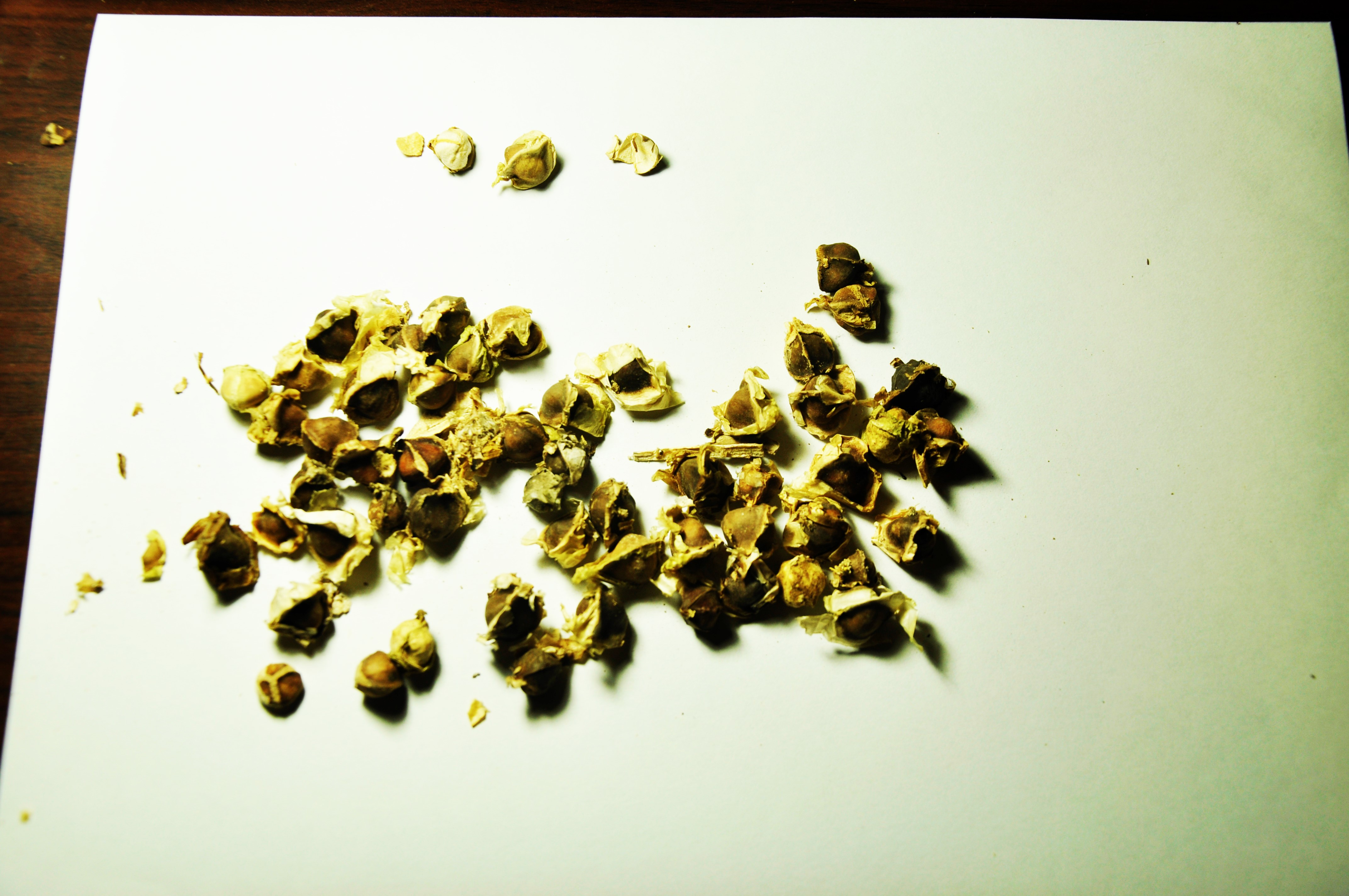
Moringa seeds

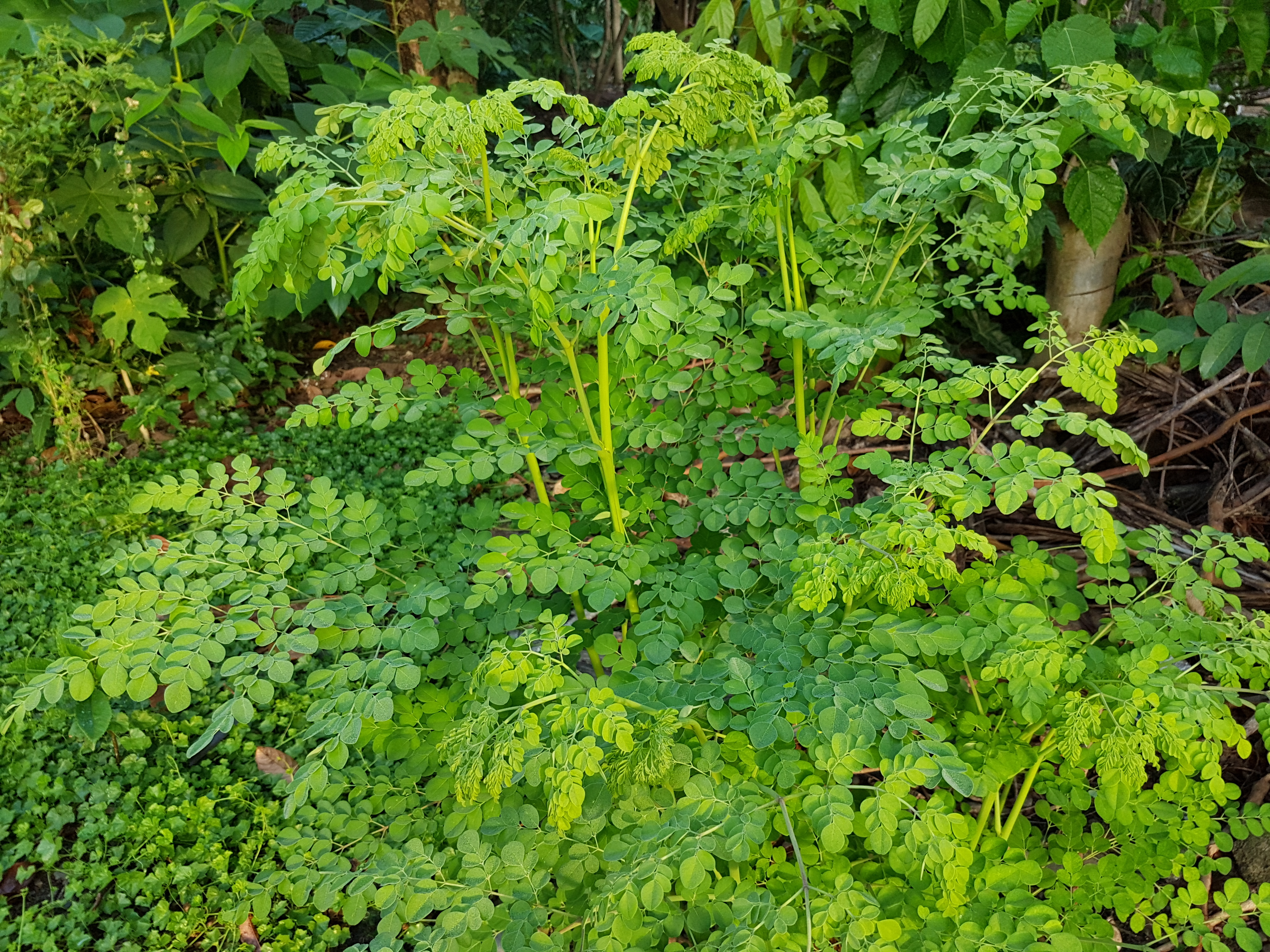
Foliage of Moringa oleifera

M. oleifera is a fast-growing, deciduous tree that can reach a height of 10–12 m (33–39 ft) and trunk diameter of 46 cm (18 in). The bark has a whitish-gray color and is surrounded by thick cork. Young shoots have purplish or greenish-white, hairy bark. The tree has an open crown of drooping, fragile branches, and the leaves build up a feathery foliage of tripinnate leaves.

The flowers are fragrant and hermaphroditic, surrounded by five unequal, thinly veined, yellowish-white petals. The flowers are about 1–1.5 cm (3/8–5/8 in) long and 2 cm (3/4 in) broad. They grow on slender, hairy stalks in spreading or drooping flower clusters, which have a length of 10–25 cm (4–10 in).

Flowering begins within the first six months of planting. In seasonally cool regions, flowering only occurs once a year in late spring and early summer (Northern Hemisphere between April and June, Southern Hemisphere between October and December). In more constant seasonal temperatures and with constant rainfall, flowering can happen twice or even all year-round.

The fruit is a hanging, three-sided, brown, 20–45 cm (8–17 1/2 in) capsule, which holds dark brown, globular seeds with a diameter around 1 cm. The seeds have three whitish, papery wings and are dispersed by wind and water.

== Taxonomy ==
French botanist François Alexandre Pierre de Garsault described the species as Balanus myrepsica, but his names are not accepted as valid, as he did not always give his descriptions binomial names.

French naturalist Jean-Baptiste Lamarck described the species in 1785. A combined analysis of morphology and DNA shows that M. oleifera is most closely related to M. concanensis, and the common ancestor of these two diverged from the lineage of M. peregrina.

=== Etymology ===
The genus name Moringa derives from the Tamil word, murungai, meaning "twisted pod", alluding to the young fruit. The specific name oleifera is derived from the Latin words oleum "oil" and ferre "to bear".

The plant has numerous common names across regions where it is cultivated, with drumstick tree, horseradish tree, or simply moringa used in English.

== Ecology ==
The moringa tree is not affected by any serious diseases in its native or introduced ranges. In India, several insect pests are seen, including various caterpillars such as the bark-eating caterpillar, the hairy caterpillar, or the green leaf caterpillar. Budworms from the Noctuidae are known to cause serious defoliation. Damaging agents can also be aphids, stem borers, and fruit flies. In some regions, termites can also cause minor damage. If termites are numerous in soils, insect-management costs are not bearable.

The moringa tree is a host to Leveillula taurica, a powdery mildew, which causes damage in papaya crops in south India. Furthermore, the caterpillars of the snout moth Noorda blitealis feed primarily on the leaves and can cause complete leaf loss.

=== As an invasive species ===
Although listed as an invasive species in several countries, one source reports that M. oleifera has "not been observed invading intact habitats or displacing native flora", so "should be regarded at present as a widely cultivated species with low invasive potential."

== Cultivation ==
The moringa tree is grown mainly in semiarid, tropical, and subtropical areas, corresponding in the United States to USDA hardiness zones 9 and 10. It tolerates a wide range of soil conditions, but prefers a neutral to slightly acidic (pH 6.3 to 7.0), well-drained, sandy or loamy soil. In waterlogged soil, the roots have a tendency to rot. Moringa is a sun- and heat-loving plant, and does not tolerate freezing or frost. Moringa is particularly suitable for dry regions, as it can be grown using rainwater without expensive irrigation techniques.

Parameter	Requirement/range
Climate	Grows best in tropical or subtropical
Altitude	0 – 2,000 m (6,600 ft)
Rainfall	250–3,000 mm (9.8–118.1 in) Irrigation needed for leaf production if rainfall < 800 mm (31 in)
Soil Type	Loamy, sandy, or sandy loam
Soil pH	pH 5–9

=== Production area ===
India is the largest producer of moringa, with an annual production of 1.2 million tonnes of fruit from an area of 380 km^{2} (150 sq mi). Among Indian states, Tamil Nadu leads in cultivation area followed by Andhra Pradesh and Karnataka.

Moringa is grown in home gardens and as living fences in South and Southeast Asia, where it is commonly sold in local markets. In the Philippines and Indonesia, it is commonly grown for its leaves, which are used as food. Moringa is also actively cultivated by the World Vegetable Center in Taiwan, a center for vegetable research.

More generally, moringa grows in the wild or is cultivated in Central America and the Caribbean, northern countries of South America, Africa, South and Southeast Asia, and various countries of Oceania.

As of 2010, cultivation in Hawaii was in the early stages for commercial distribution in the US.

=== Cultivation practice ===
In cultivation, the tree is often cut back annually to 1–2 m (3 1/2–6 1/2 ft) and allowed to regrow so the pods and leaves remain within arm's reach.

==== Soil preparation ====
In tropical cultivation, soil erosion is a major problem, requiring soil treatment to be as shallow as possible. Plowing is required only for high planting densities. In low planting densities, digging pits and refilling them with soil is preferable to ensure good root system penetration without causing too much land erosion. Optimal pits are 30–50 cm (12–20 in) deep and 20–40 cm (8–15 1/2 in) wide.

==== Propagation ====
Moringa can be propagated from seed or cuttings. Direct seeding is possible because the germination rate of M. oleifera is high. Moringa seeds can be germinated year-round in well-draining soil. Cuttings of 1 m (3.3 ft) length and at least 4 cm (1 1/2 in) diameter can be used for vegetative propagation.

=== Breeding ===
In India, from where moringa most likely originated, the diversity of wild types gives a good basis for breeding programs. In countries where moringa has been introduced, the diversity is usually much smaller among the cultivar types. Locally well-adapted wild types, though, can be found in most regions.

Because moringa is cultivated and used in different ways, breeding aims for an annual or a perennial plant are obviously different. The yield stability of fruits is an important breeding aim for the commercial cultivation in India, where moringa is cultivated as an annual. On less favorable locations, perennial cultivation has big advantages, such as less erosion. In Pakistan, varieties have been tested for the nutritional composition of their leaves on different locations. India selects for a higher number of pods and dwarf or semidwarf varieties. Breeders in Tanzania, though, are selecting for higher oil content.

=== Yield and harvest ===
M. oleifera can be cultivated for its leaves, pods, and/or its kernels for oil extraction and water purification. The yields vary widely, depending on season, variety, fertilization, and irrigation regimen. Moringa yields best under warm, dry conditions with some supplemental fertilizer and irrigation. Harvest is done manually with knives, sickles, and stabs with hooks attached. Pollarding, coppicing, and lopping or pruning are recommended to promote branching, increase production, and facilitate harvesting.

=== Fruits ===
When the plant is grown from cuttings, the first harvest can take place 6–8 months after planting. Often, the fruits are not produced in the first year, and the yield is generally low during the first few years. By year two, it produces around 300 pods, by year three around 400–500. A good tree can yield 1,000 or more pods. In India, a hectare can produce 31 tons of pods per year. Under North Indian conditions, the fruits ripen during the summer. Sometimes, particularly in South India, flowers and fruit appear twice a year, so two harvests occur, in July to September and March to April.

=== Leaves ===
Average yields of 6 tons/ha/year (2 tons per acre) in fresh matter can be achieved. The harvest differs strongly between the rainy and dry seasons, with 1120 kilogram/ha (1000 lb per acre) per harvest and 690 kg/ha (620 lb per acre) per harvest, respectively. The leaves and stems can be harvested from the young plants 60 days after seeding and then another seven times in the year. At every harvest, the plants are cut back to within 60 cm (2') of the ground. In some production systems, the leaves are harvested every 2 weeks.

The cultivation of M. oleifera can also be done intensively with irrigation and fertilization with suitable varieties. Trials in Nicaragua with 1 million plants per hectare and 9 cuttings/year over 4 years gave an average fresh matter production of 580 metric tons/ha/year (230 long tons per acre), equivalent to about 174 metric tons of fresh leaves.

=== Oil ===
One estimate for yield of oil from kernels is 250 L/ha (22 imperial gallons per acre). The oil can be used as a food supplement, as a base for cosmetics, and for hair and the skin. Seeds of Moringa can also be used in production of biofuel.

== Toxicity ==
Toxicity data in humans are limited, although laboratory studies indicate that certain compounds in the bark and roots or their extracts may cause adverse effects when consumed in excess. Supplementation with M. oleifera leaf extract is potentially toxic at levels exceeding 3,000 mg/kg of body weight, but safe at levels below 1,000 mg/kg.

M. oleifera may interfere with prescription drugs affecting cytochrome P450 (including CYP3A4) and may inhibit the antihyperglycemic effect of sitagliptin.

=== Regulation ===
In November 2025, Food Standards Australia New Zealand rejected an application to approve Moringa oleifera leaves, immature pods, and oil as a novel food. The decision cited insufficient evidence to confirm its safety for human consumption as a food. As a result (confirmed in May 2026 via Department of Agriculture notices), moringa is not permitted as food or a food ingredient for retail sale in Australia or New Zealand.

== Uses ==
M. oleifera has numerous applications in cooking throughout its regional distribution. Edible parts of the plant include the whole leaves (leaflets, stalks and stems); the immature, green fruits or seed pods; the fragrant flowers; and the young seeds and roots.

Moringa oleifera leaf, raw
Nutritional value per 100 g (3.5 oz)
- Energy: 64 kcal (270 kJ)
- Carbohydrates: 8.28 g
- Dietary fiber: 2.0 g
- Fat: 1.40 g
- Protein: 9.40 g
Vitamins and minerals
Vitamins	Quantity %DV^{†}
Vitamin A equiv.	42% 378 μg
Thiamine (B1)	21% 0.257 mg
Riboflavin (B2)	51% 0.660 mg
Niacin (B3)	14% 2.220 mg
Pantothenic acid (B5)	3% 0.125 mg
Vitamin B6	71% 1.200 mg
Folate (B9)	10% 40 μg
Vitamin C	57% 51.7 mg
Minerals	Quantity %DV^{†}
Calcium	14% 185 mg
Iron	22% 4.00 mg
Magnesium	35% 147 mg
Manganese	16% 0.36 mg
Phosphorus	9% 112 mg
Potassium	11% 337 mg
Sodium	0% 9 mg
Zinc	5% 0.6 mg
- Other constituents: Quantity
- Water: 78.66 g
- ^{†}Percentages estimated using US recommendations for adults, except for potassium, which is estimated based on expert recommendation from the National Academies.

=== Nutrition ===
M. oleifera pods, raw
Nutritional value per 100 g (3.5 oz)
- Energy: 37 kcal (150 kJ)
- Carbohydrates: 8.53 g
- Dietary fiber: 3.2 g
- Fat: 0.20 g
- Protein: 2.10 g
Vitamins and minerals
Vitamins	Quantity %DV^{†}
Vitamin A equiv.	0% 4 μg
Thiamine (B1)	4% 0.0530 mg
Riboflavin (B2)	6% 0.074 mg
Niacin (B3)	4% 0.620 mg
Pantothenic acid (B5)	16% 0.794 mg
Vitamin B6	7% 0.120 mg
Folate (B9)	11% 44 μg
Vitamin C	157% 141.0 mg
Minerals	Quantity %DV^{†}
Calcium	2% 30 mg
Iron	2% 0.36 mg
Magnesium	11% 45 mg
Manganese	11% 0.259 mg
Phosphorus	4% 50 mg
Potassium	15% 461 mg
Sodium	2% 42 mg
Zinc	4% 0.45 mg
- Other constituents: Quantity
- Water: 88.20 g
- ^{†}Percentages estimated using US recommendations for adults, except for potassium, which is estimated based on expert recommendation from the National Academies.

Various parts of moringa are edible:

- Immature seed pods, called "drumsticks"
- Leaves
- Mature seeds
- Oil pressed from seeds
- Flowers
- Roots

Nutritional content of 100 g of fresh M. oleifera leaves (about 5 cups) is shown in the table (USDA data).

The leaves are the most nutritious part of the plant, being a significant source of B vitamins, vitamin C, provitamin A as beta-carotene, vitamin K, manganese, and protein. Some of the calcium in moringa leaves is bound as crystals of calcium oxalate. Oxalate levels may vary from 430 to 1050 mg/100g, compared to the oxalate in spinach (average 750 mg/100g).

=== Culinary ===
==== Seeds ====
The seeds can be removed from mature pods, cut, and cooked for consumption.

In Nigeria, the seeds are prized for their bitter flavor; they are commonly added to sauces or eaten as a fried snack. The edible seed oil may be used in condiments or dressings.

Ground, debittered moringa seed is suitable as a fortification ingredient to increase the protein, iron and calcium content of wheat flours.

==== Fruit pods ====
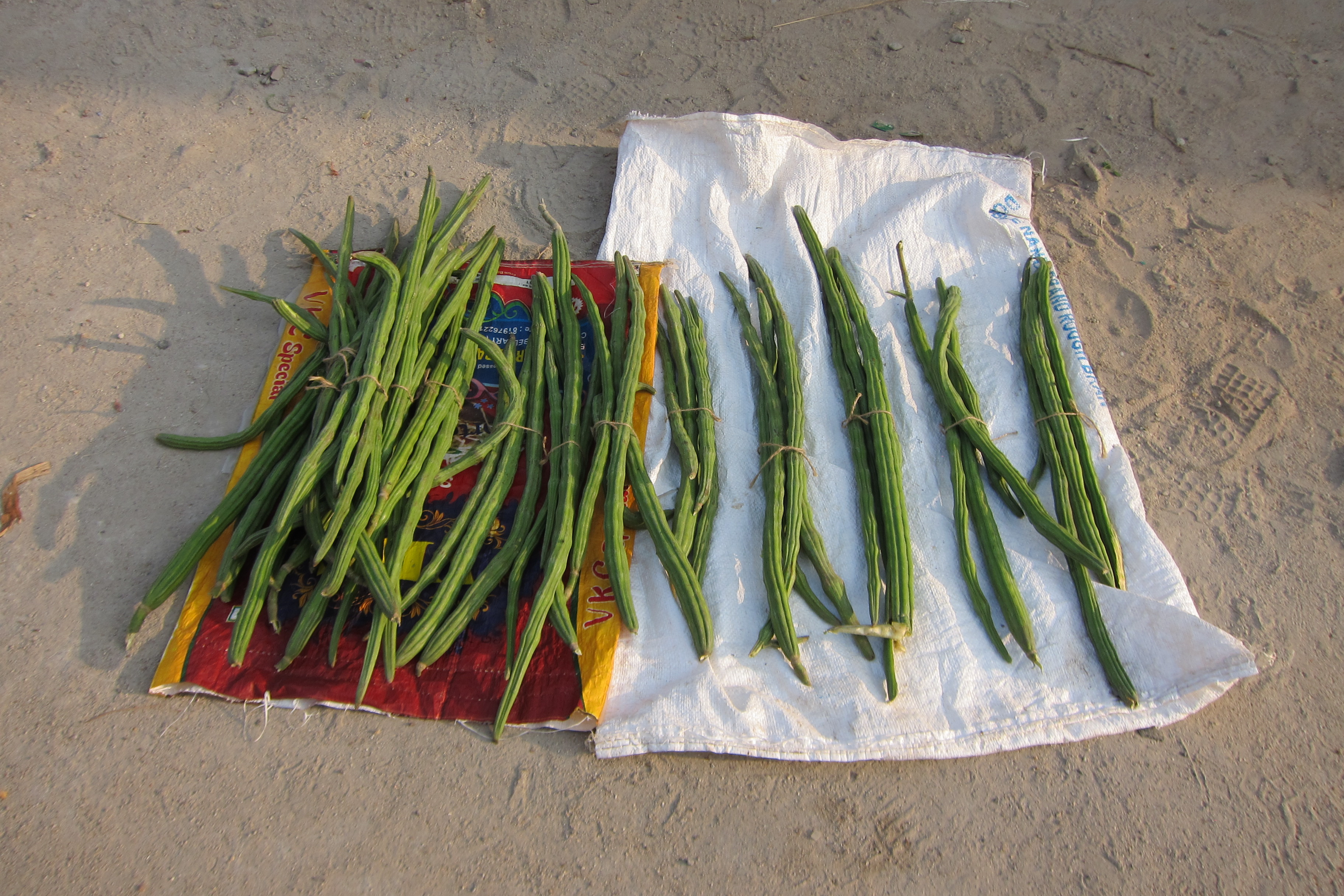
Drumstick vegetable pods at a market

The young, slender fruits, commonly known as "drumsticks", are often prepared as a culinary vegetable in South Asia. They are prepared by parboiling, commonly cut into shorter lengths, and cooked in a curry or soup until soft. Their taste is described as reminiscent of asparagus, with a hint of green beans, though sweeter due to the immature seeds contained inside. The seed pods, even when cooked by boiling, remain high in vitamin C (which may be degraded variably by cooking), and are also a good source of dietary fiber, potassium, magnesium, and manganese.

Drumstick curries are commonly prepared by boiling immature pods to the desired level of tenderness in a mixture of coconut milk and spices (such as poppy or mustard seeds). The fruit is a common ingredient in dals and lentil soups, such as drumstick dal and sambar, where it is pulped first, then simmered with other vegetables and spices such as turmeric and cumin. Mashed drumstick pulp commonly features in bhurta, a mixture of lightly fried or curried vegetables.

Because the outer skin is tough and fibrous, drumsticks are often chewed to extract the juices and nutrients, with the remaining fibrous material discarded. Others describe a slightly different method of sucking out the flesh and tender seeds and discarding the tube of skin.

==== Seed oil ====
Mature seeds yield 38–40% edible oil called ben oil from its high concentration of behenic acid. The refined oil is clear and odorless, and resists rancidity. The young fruits can be boiled and the oil skimmed off the water surface. The seed cake remaining after oil extraction may be used as a fertilizer or as a flocculent to purify water. Moringa seed oil also has potential for use as a biofuel.

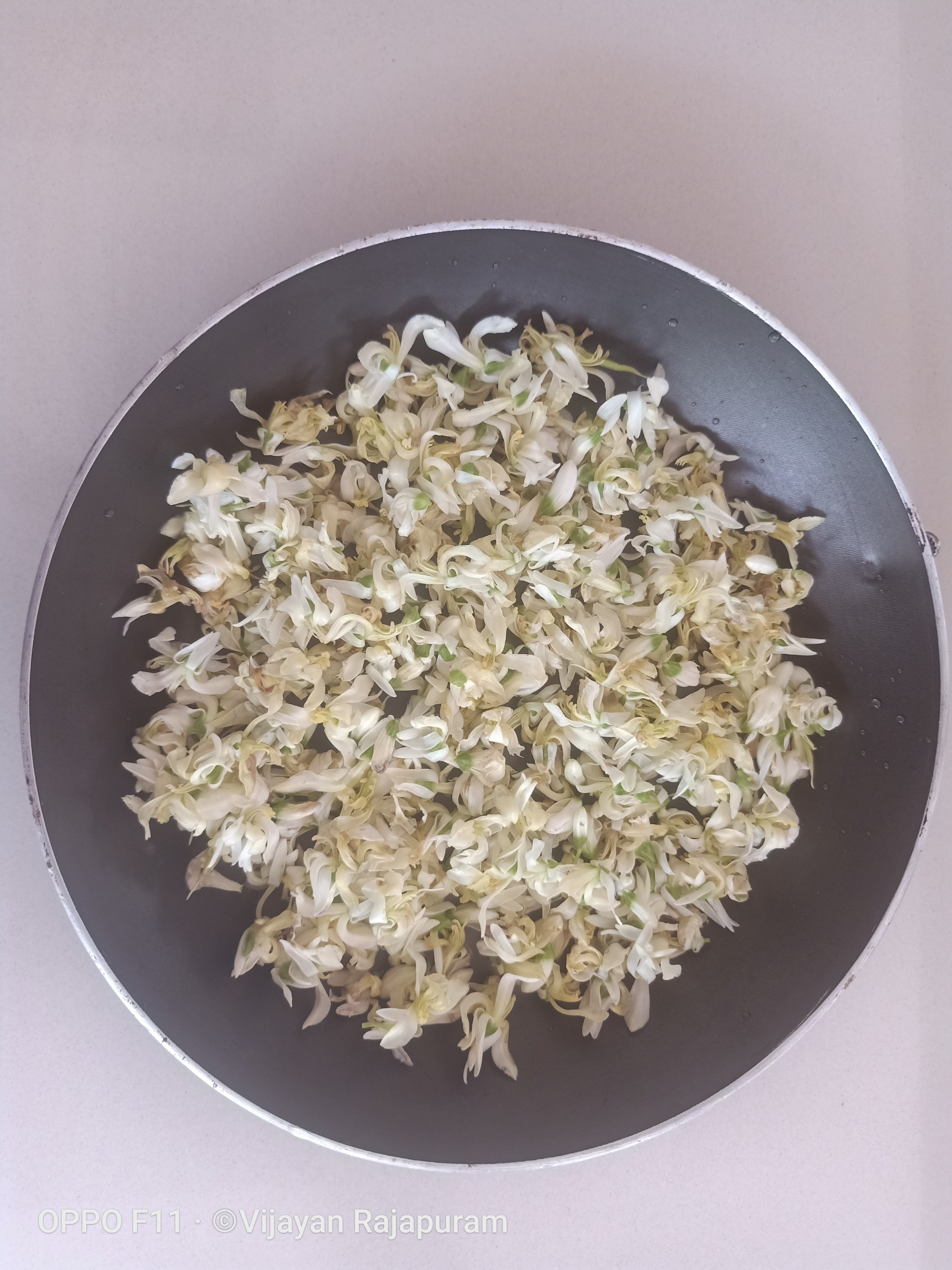
Flowers prepared for cooking

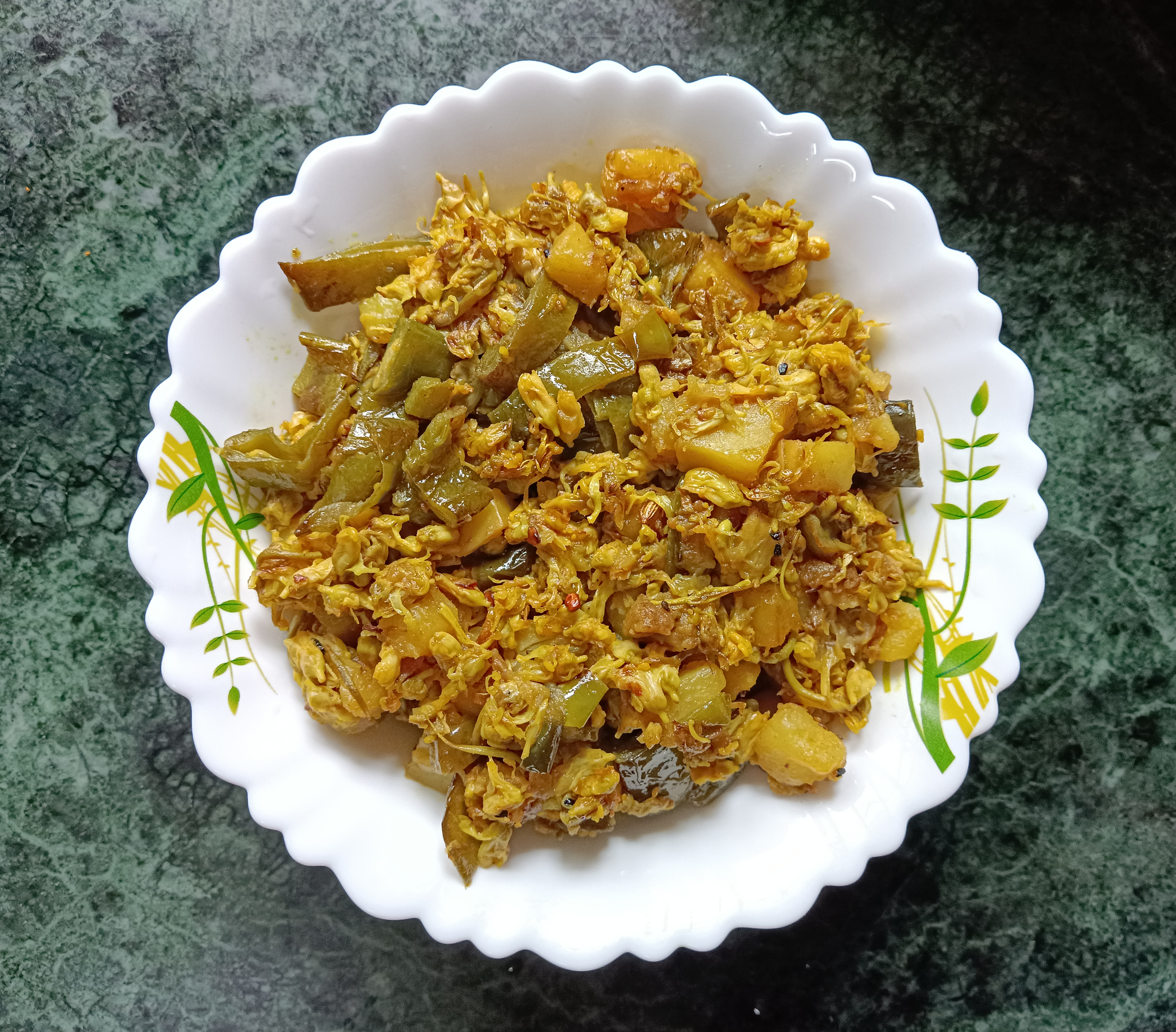
Moringa flowers in Bengali chorchori, with additional vegetables

==== Roots ====
The roots are shredded and used as a condiment with sharp flavor qualities deriving from significant content of polyphenols.

==== Flowers ====
The flowers are a springtime delicacy in Bengali cuisine. Moringa flowers are typically cooked into chorchori and fritters.

==== Leaves ====
Edible raw or cooked (depending on hardiness), the leaves can be used in many ways. They are perhaps most commonly added to clear broth-based soups, such as the Filipino dishes tinola and utan. Tender moringa leaves, finely chopped, are used as garnish for vegetable dishes and salads, such as the Kerala dish thoran. It is also used in place of or along with coriander leaves (cilantro). The leaves are also cooked and used in ways similar to spinach, and are commonly dried and crushed into a powder for soups and sauces.

For long-term use and storage, moringa leaves may be dried and powdered to preserve their nutrients. Sun, shade, freeze and oven drying at 50–60 °C are all acceptable methods, albeit variable in their retention efficacy of specific micro- and macronutrients. The powder is commonly added to soups, sauces, and smoothies. Owing to its high nutritional density, moringa leaf powder is valued as a dietary supplement and may be used to enrich food products ranging from dairy, such as yogurt and cheese, to baked goods, such as bread and pastries, with acceptable palatability.

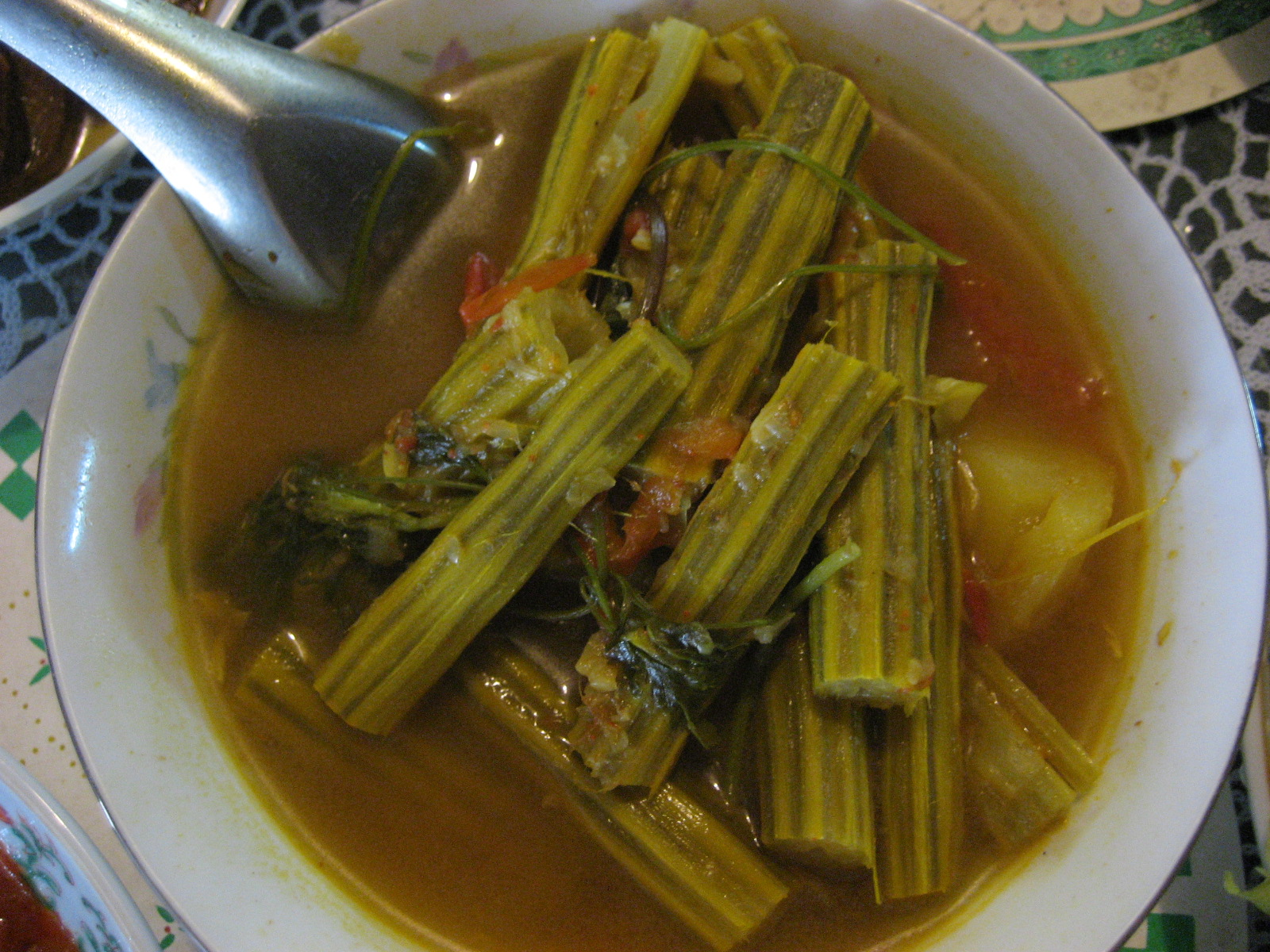
Dunt-dalun chin-yei, Burmese drumstick sour soup

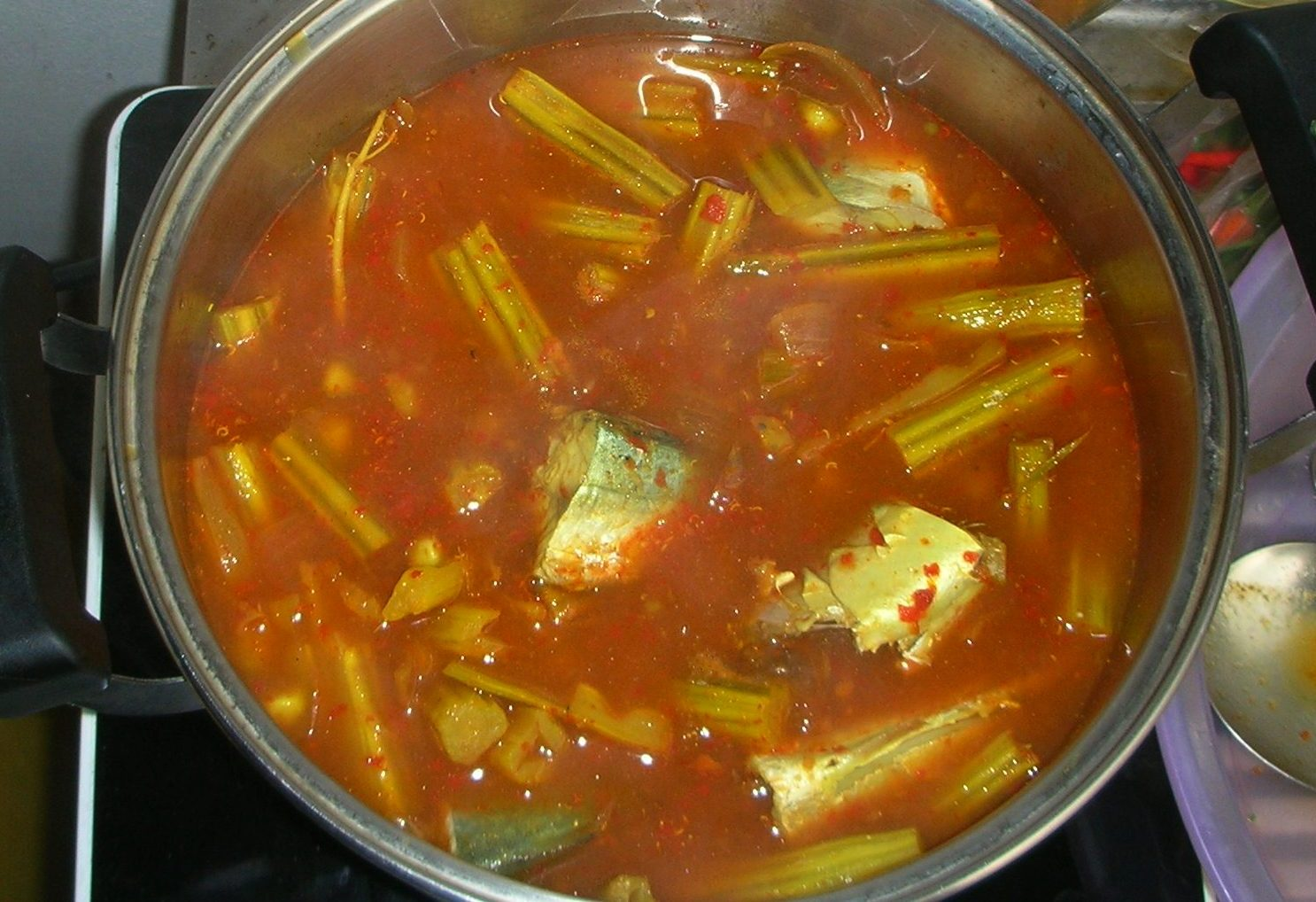
Traditional Thai kaeng som with drumstick pods and fresh pla thu

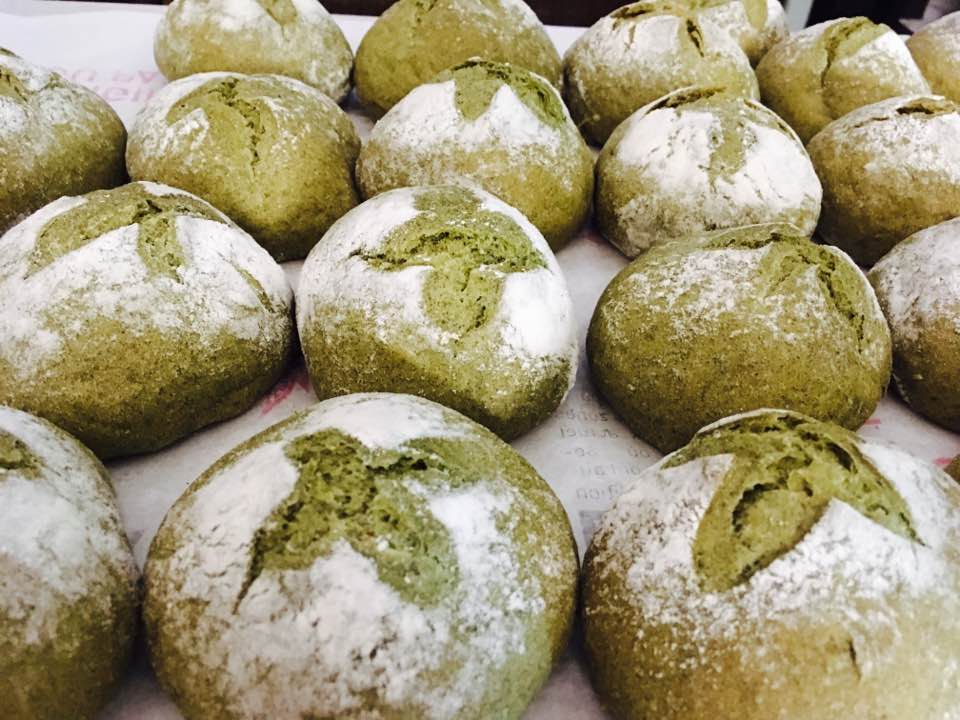
Bread in Benin with moringa powder as one of the ingredients

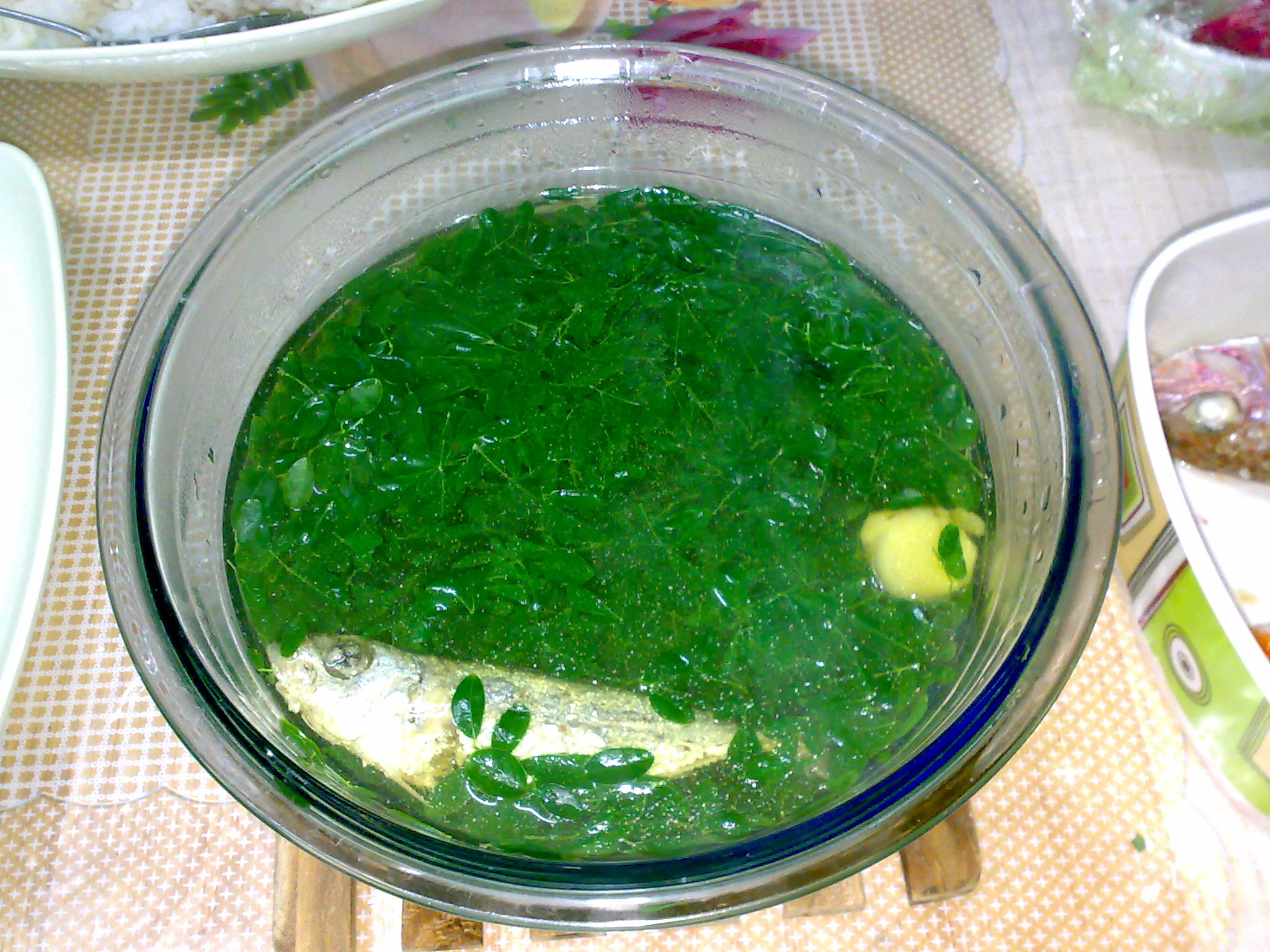
Sabaw sa kalamunggay, a Visayan fish soup from the Philippines with moringa leaves

=== Traditional medicine and research ===
The bark, sap, roots, leaves, seeds, and flowers are used in traditional medicine.

Research has examined how it might affect blood lipid profiles and insulin secretion. Extracts from leaves contain various polyphenols, which are under basic research to determine their potential effects in humans. Despite considerable preliminary research to determine if moringa components have bioactive properties, no high-quality evidence has been found to indicate that it has any effect on health or diseases.

=== Honey production ===
According to the Department of Agriculture and Fisheries (Queensland), the moringa tree is useful for honey production because it blooms for a long period of the year.

=== Other uses ===
In developing countries, moringa has the potential to improve nutrition, boost food security, foster rural development, and support sustainable landcare. It may be used as forage for livestock, a micronutrient liquid, a natural anthelmintic, and possible adjuvant.

Moringa trees have been used to combat malnutrition, especially among infants and nursing mothers. Since moringa thrives in arid and semiarid environments, it may provide a versatile, nutritious food source throughout the year in various geographic regions. Some 140 organizations worldwide have initiated moringa cultivation programs to lessen malnutrition, purify water, and produce oils for cooking.

Moringa oleifera leaf powder was as effective as soap for hand washing when wetted in advance to enable antiseptic and detergent properties from phytochemicals in the leaves. Moringa oleifera seeds and press cake have been implemented as wastewater conditioners for dewatering and drying fecal sludge.

Moringa seed cake, obtained as a byproduct of pressing seeds to obtain oil, is used to filter water using flocculation to produce potable water for animals or humans. Moringa seeds contain dimeric cationic proteins, which absorb and neutralize colloidal charges in turbid water, causing the colloidal particles to clump together, making the suspended particles easier to remove as sludge by either settling or filtration. Combination of moringa seed protein, biochar, and sand removes toxicants in water, including E. coli, making the treated drinking water safe by international water quality criteria. This use is of particular interest for being nontoxic and sustainable compared to other materials in moringa-growing regions where drinking water is affected by pollutants. In 2026, it was also reported that the plant's seed-based saline extract was able to remove 98% of microplastics from tap water. Moringa oleifera thus showed its potential as a sustainable alternative for microplastics removal from drinking water via in-line filtration.

== Gallery ==
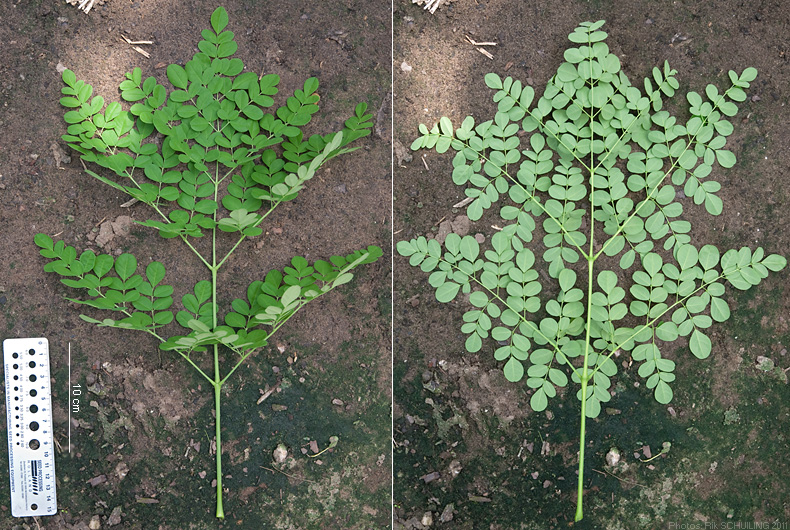
Upper and lower side of the tripinnate leaf of M. oleifera

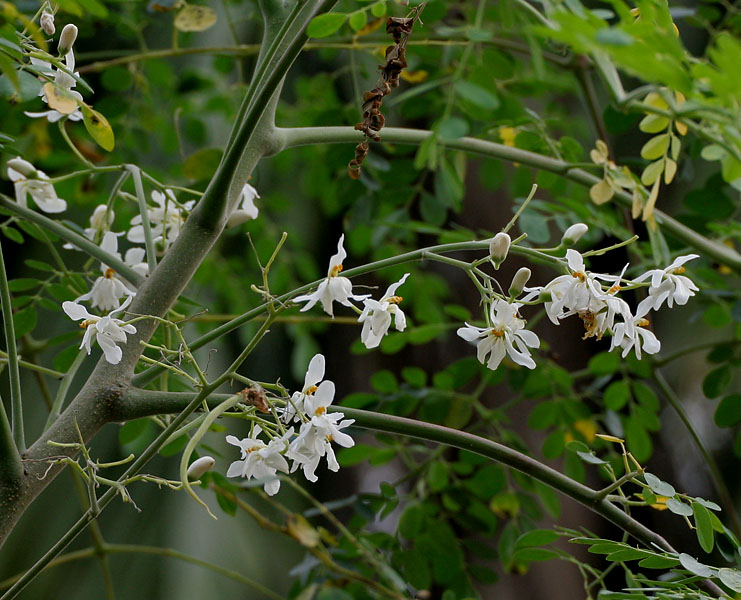
Branch of a fully grown moringa tree with flowers and leaves (West Bengal)

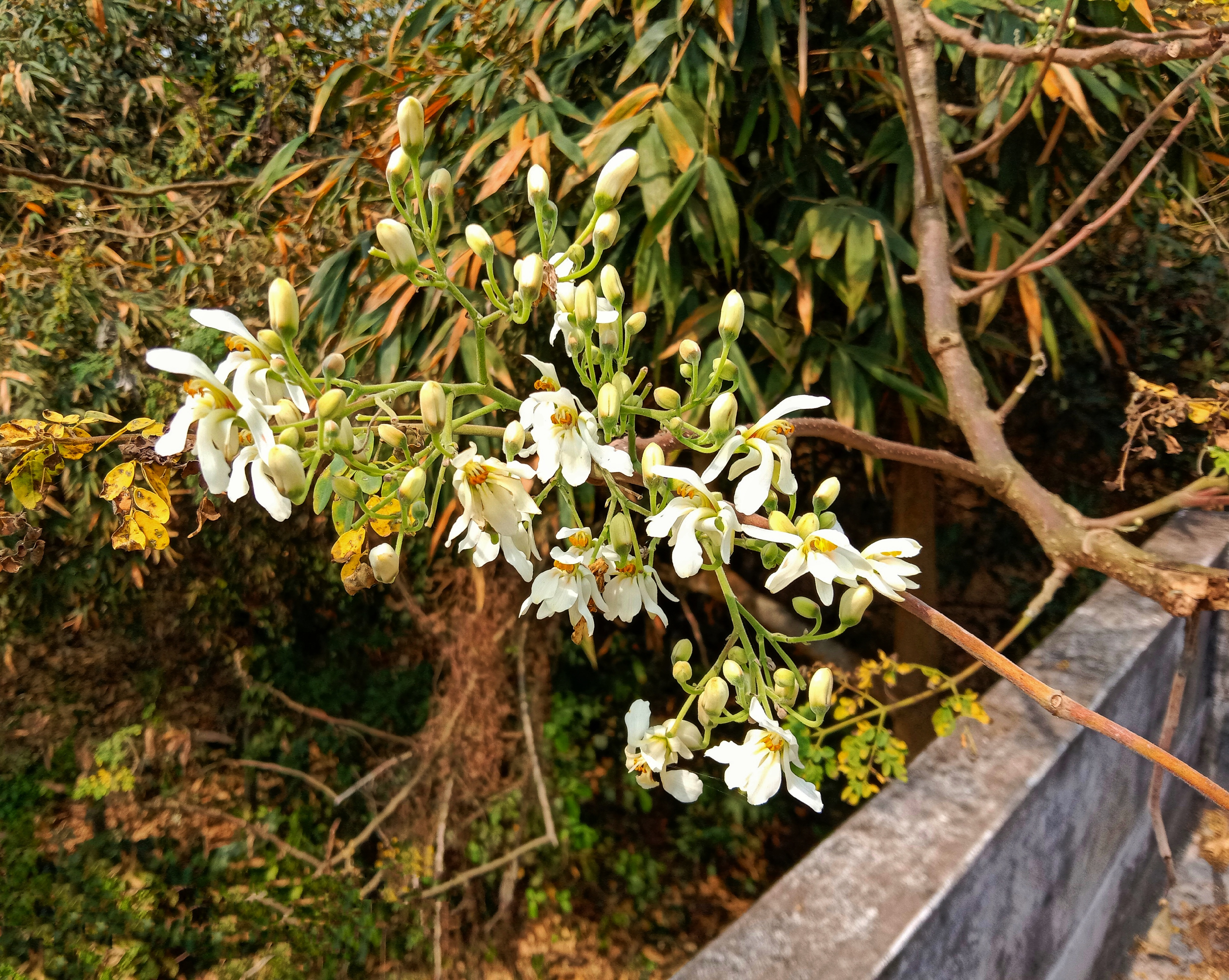
Flowers of M. oleifera on a morning

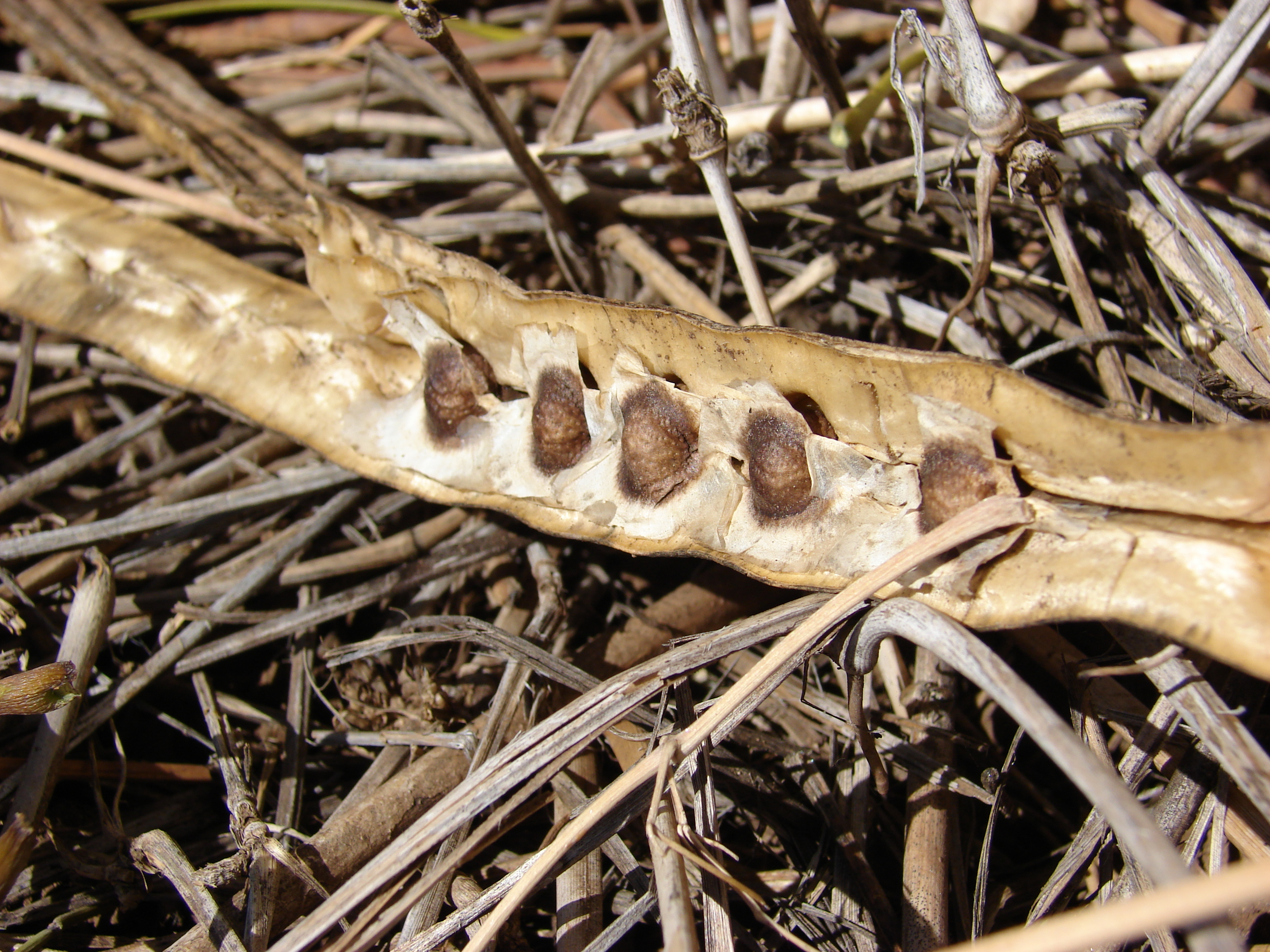
Dry open moringa pod on the ground showing winged seeds (Hawaii)
