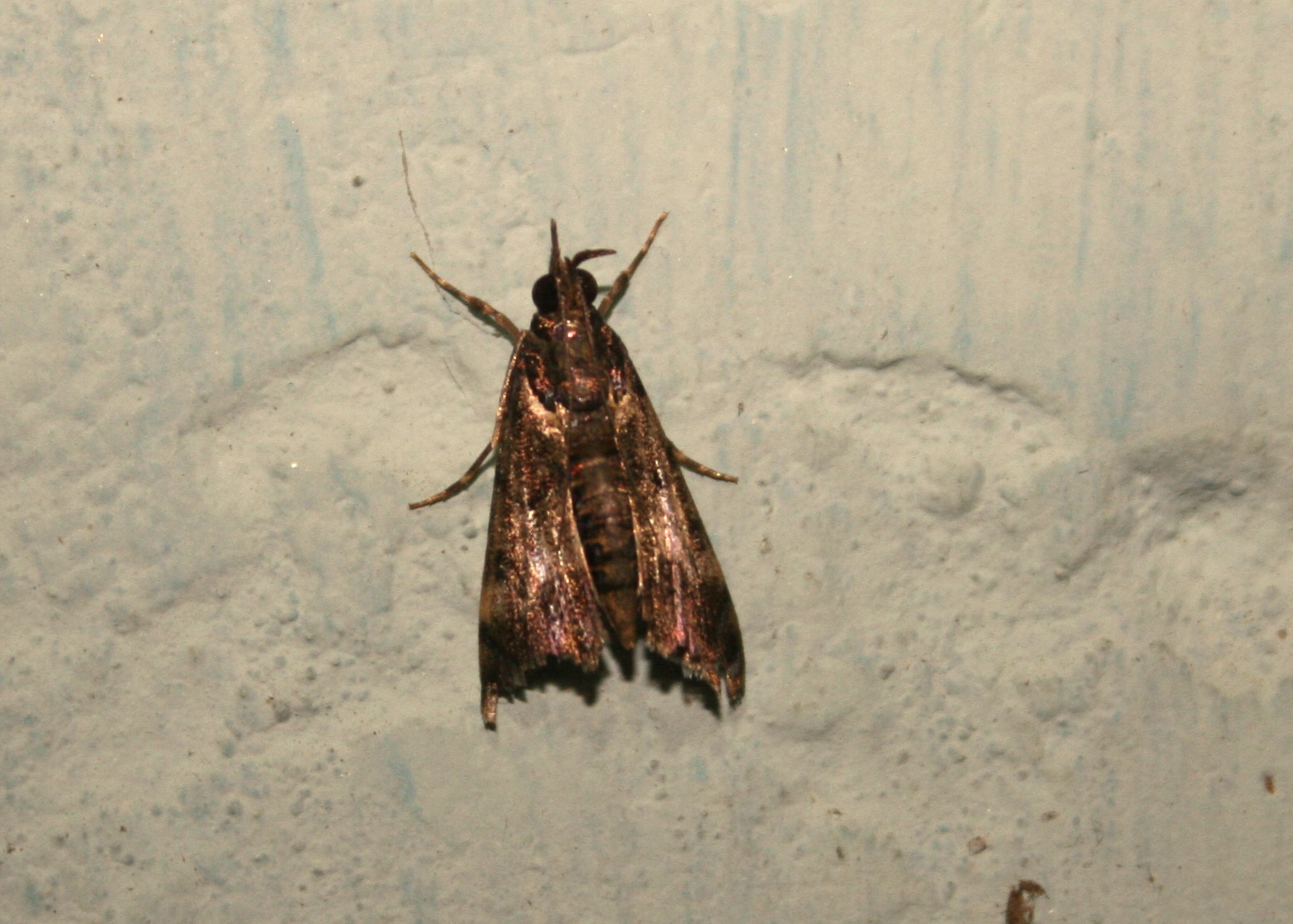
- Noorda blitealis

Scientific classification
- Kingdom: Animalia
- Phylum: Arthropoda
- Clade: Pancrustacea
- Class: Insecta
- Order: Lepidoptera
- Family: Crambidae
- Subfamily: Noordinae; Minet, 1980
- Genus: Noorda; Walker, 1859

Synonyms
- Epinoorda Rebel, 1902

= Noorda =

Genus of moths

Noorda is a genus of moths of the family Crambidae, and the only genus in the subfamily Noordinae.

== Species ==
- Noorda aeanalis West, 1931
- Noorda affinis Rothschild, 1916
- Noorda anthophilalis Strand, 1909
- Noorda apiensis Rebel, 1915
- Noorda arfakensis Kenrick, 1912
- Noorda atripalpalis Zerny in Rebel & Zerny, 191
- Noorda blitealis Walker, 1859
- Noorda caradjae (Rebel, 1902)
- Noorda diehlalis Marion & Viette, 1956
- Noorda margaronialis Hampson in Hampson, 1912
- Noorda palealis Viette, 1957
- Noorda purpureiplagialis Rothschild, 1916
- Noorda senatoria (Meyrick, 1932)
- Noorda trimaculalis Amsel, 1965
- Noorda unipunctalis Amsel, 1963

== Former species ==
- Noorda moringae Tams, 1938
- Noorda villiersi Marion, 1957
