= Noorda senatoria =

Scientific classification
- Kingdom: Animalia
- Phylum: Arthropoda
- Class: Insecta
- Order: Lepidoptera
- Family: Crambidae
- Genus: Noorda
- Species: N. senatoria

Binomial name
- Noorda senatoria (Meyrick, 1932)

Synonyms
- Argyria senatoria Meyrick, 1932

Species of moth

Noorda senatoria is a moth in the family Crambidae. It was described by Edward Meyrick in 1932. It is found on Fiji.
