= Viettessa bethalis =

Scientific classification
- Kingdom: Animalia
- Phylum: Arthropoda
- Clade: Pancrustacea
- Class: Insecta
- Order: Lepidoptera
- Family: Crambidae
- Genus: Viettessa
- Species: V. bethalis

Binomial name
- Viettessa bethalis (Viette, 1958)

Synonyms
- Noorda bethalis Viette, 1958

Species of moth

Viettessa bethalis is a moth of the family Crambidae. It is known from Madagascar, Cameroon, Congo and Malawi.
