= Indarbela watsoni =

Scientific classification
- Kingdom: Animalia
- Phylum: Arthropoda
- Class: Insecta
- Order: Lepidoptera
- Family: Cossidae
- Genus: Indarbela
- Species: I. watsoni

Binomial name
- Indarbela watsoni (Hampson, 1900)

Synonyms
- Lepidarbela watsoni Hampson, 1900

Species of moth

Indarbela watsoni is a moth in the family Cossidae. It is found in India.
