= Viettessa =

Scientific classification
- Kingdom: Animalia
- Phylum: Arthropoda
- Clade: Pancrustacea
- Class: Insecta
- Order: Lepidoptera
- Family: Crambidae
- Tribe: Eurrhypini
- Genus: Viettessa; Minet, 1980

Genus of moths

Viettessa is a genus of moths of the family Crambidae.

== Species ==
- Viettessa bethalis (Viette, 1958)
- Viettessa margaritalis (Hampson, 1899)
- Viettessa villiersi (Marion, 1957)
