= Noorda apiensis =

Scientific classification
- Domain: Eukaryota
- Kingdom: Animalia
- Phylum: Arthropoda
- Class: Insecta
- Order: Lepidoptera
- Family: Crambidae
- Genus: Noorda
- Species: N. apiensis

Binomial name
- Noorda apiensis Rebel, 1915

Species of moth

Noorda apiensis is a moth in the family Crambidae. It was described by Rebel in 1915. It is found on Samoa.
