= Squamura =

Scientific classification
- Kingdom: Animalia
- Phylum: Arthropoda
- Class: Insecta
- Order: Lepidoptera
- Family: Cossidae
- Subfamily: Metarbelinae
- Genus: Squamura; Heylaerts, 1890

Genus of moths

Squamura is a genus of moths in the family Cossidae.

== Species ==
- Squamura acutistriata (Mell, 1923)
- Squamura celebensis Roepke, 1957
- Squamura disciplaga (Swinhoe, 1901)
- Squamura kinabalua (Holloway, 1976)
- Squamura maculata Heylaerts, 1890
- Squamura roepkei Holloway, 1982
- Squamura tenera Roepke, 1957

== Former species ==
- Squamura sumatrana Roepke, 1957
