= Noorda margaronialis =

Scientific classification
- Kingdom: Animalia
- Phylum: Arthropoda
- Class: Insecta
- Order: Lepidoptera
- Family: Crambidae
- Genus: Noorda
- Species: N. margaronialis

Binomial name
- Noorda margaronialis Hampson in Hampson, 1912

Species of moth

Noorda margaronialis is a moth in the family Crambidae. It was described by George Hampson in 1912. It is found in the Punjab region of what was British India.
