= Indarbela salara =

Scientific classification
- Kingdom: Animalia
- Phylum: Arthropoda
- Class: Insecta
- Order: Lepidoptera
- Family: Cossidae
- Genus: Indarbela
- Species: I. salara

Binomial name
- Indarbela salara (H. Druce, 1900)

Synonyms
- Lepidarbela salara H. Druce, 1900

Species of moth

Indarbela salara is a moth in the family Cossidae first described by Herbert Druce in 1900. It is found in Colombia.
