= Arbela baibarana =

Scientific classification
- Kingdom: Animalia
- Phylum: Arthropoda
- Clade: Pancrustacea
- Class: Insecta
- Order: Hemiptera
- Suborder: Heteroptera
- Family: Nabidae
- Genus: Arbela
- Species: A. baibarana

Binomial name
- Arbela baibarana Matsumura, 1927

Species of true bug

Arbela baibarana is an insect in the family Nabidae. It is found in China (including Fujian).

In eastern China, there is one generation per year.

The larvae feed on various trees, including Casuarina and Acacia species. Larvae can be found from May to December. The species overwinters as a mature larva in a tunnel made in the host plant.
