= Indarbela magma =

Scientific classification
- Kingdom: Animalia
- Phylum: Arthropoda
- Class: Insecta
- Order: Lepidoptera
- Family: Cossidae
- Genus: Indarbela
- Species: I. magma

Binomial name
- Indarbela magma (de Joannis, 1929)

Synonyms
- Arbela magma de Joannis, 1929; Squamura magma

Species of moth

Indarbela magma is a moth in the family Cossidae. It is found in Vietnam.
