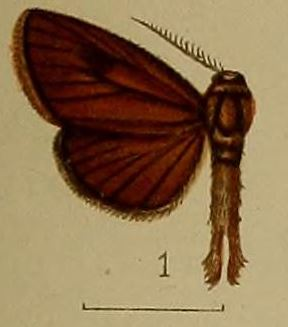

Scientific classification
- Kingdom: Animalia
- Phylum: Arthropoda
- Class: Insecta
- Order: Lepidoptera
- Family: Cossidae
- Genus: Indarbela
- Species: I. theivora

Binomial name
- Indarbela theivora (Hampson, 1910)

Synonyms
- Lepidarbela theivora Hampson, 1910

= Indarbela theivora =

Species of moth

Indarbela theivora is a moth in the family Cossidae. It is found in India (Assam).
