= Indarbela tesselatus =

Scientific classification
- Kingdom: Animalia
- Phylum: Arthropoda
- Class: Insecta
- Order: Lepidoptera
- Family: Cossidae
- Genus: Indarbela
- Species: I. tesselatus

Binomial name
- Indarbela tesselatus (Moore, 1879)

Synonyms
- Cossus tesselatus Moore, 1879

Species of moth

Indarbela tesselatus is a moth in the family Cossidae. It is found in India.
