= Noorda caradjae =

Scientific classification
- Domain: Eukaryota
- Kingdom: Animalia
- Phylum: Arthropoda
- Class: Insecta
- Order: Lepidoptera
- Family: Crambidae
- Genus: Noorda
- Species: N. caradjae

Binomial name
- Noorda caradjae (Rebel, 1902)

Synonyms
- Epinoorda caradjae Rebel, 1902

Species of moth

Noorda caradjae is a moth in the family Crambidae. It was described by Rebel in 1902. It has been recorded from the Jordan Valley.
