= Arbela elegantula =

Scientific classification
- Kingdom: Animalia
- Phylum: Arthropoda
- Clade: Pancrustacea
- Class: Insecta
- Order: Hemiptera
- Suborder: Heteroptera
- Family: Nabidae
- Genus: Arbela
- Species: A. elegantula

Binomial name
- Arbela elegantula Stål, 1866

Species of true bug

Arbela elegantula is a species of African damsel bug in the family Nabidae.

== Subspecies ==
- Arbela elegantula elegantula Stål 1866 (from Réunion, Madagascar, Seychelles, Tanzania, Zambia, Congo)
- Arbela elegantula occidentalis Kerzhner, 1986 (from Cameroun, Congo, Ethiopia, Gabon, Moroccos; Senegal, Ivory Coast)
