= Viettessa margaritalis =

Scientific classification
- Kingdom: Animalia
- Phylum: Arthropoda
- Class: Insecta
- Order: Lepidoptera
- Family: Crambidae
- Genus: Viettessa
- Species: V. margaritalis

Binomial name
- Viettessa margaritalis (Hampson, 1899)

Synonyms
- Noorda margaritalis Hampson, 1899

Species of moth

Viettessa margaritalis is a moth in the family Crambidae. It was described by George Hampson in 1899. It is found in the Democratic Republic of the Congo (Kasai-Occidental, Katanga), Mozambique, Sierra Leone and Tanzania.
