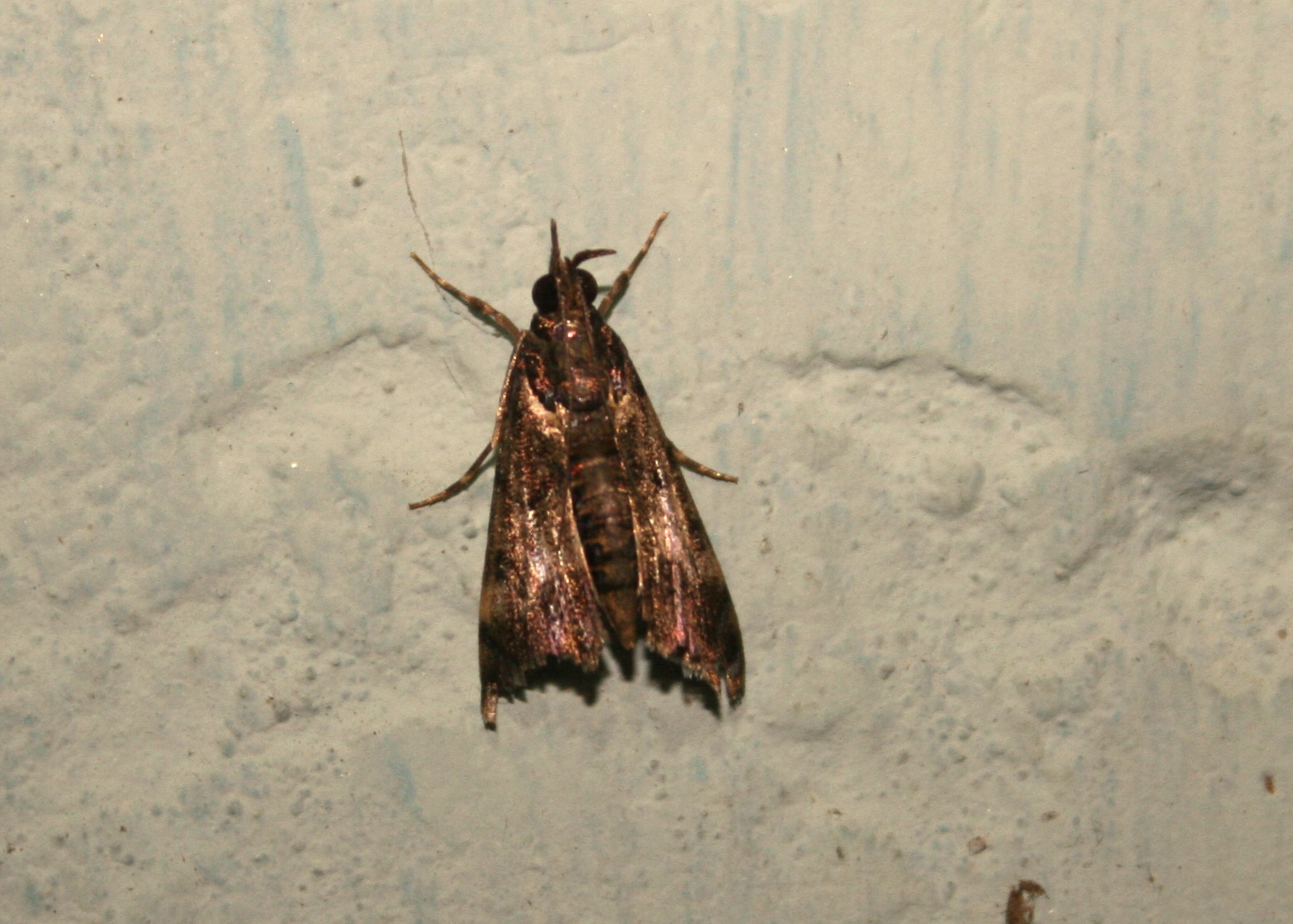
- From Sri Lanka

Scientific classification
- Kingdom: Animalia
- Phylum: Arthropoda
- Clade: Pancrustacea
- Class: Insecta
- Order: Lepidoptera
- Family: Crambidae
- Genus: Noorda
- Species: N. blitealis

Binomial name
- Noorda blitealis Walker, 1859

Synonyms
- Noorda moringae Tams, 1938; Scopula subjectalis Walker, 1866; Argyria holocrossa Meyrick 1902

= Noorda blitealis =

Species of moth

Noorda blitealis is a species of moth of the family Crambidae. It is found in subtropical Africa, south of the Sahara and in Australasia (Australia, Sri Lanka, India, Thailand).

It has a wingspan of about 19–22 mm.

== Host plants ==
The larvae are an important defoliator of Moringa oleifera (Moringaceae).
