= Indarbela campbelli =

Scientific classification
- Kingdom: Animalia
- Phylum: Arthropoda
- Class: Insecta
- Order: Lepidoptera
- Family: Cossidae
- Genus: Indarbela
- Species: I. campbelli

Binomial name
- Indarbela campbelli (Hampson, 1910)

Synonyms
- Lepidarbela campbelli Hampson, 1910

Species of moth

Indarbela campbelli is a moth in the family Cossidae. It is found in India (Madras).
