= Indarbela tacita =

Scientific classification
- Kingdom: Animalia
- Phylum: Arthropoda
- Class: Insecta
- Order: Lepidoptera
- Family: Cossidae
- Genus: Indarbela
- Species: I. tacita

Binomial name
- Indarbela tacita (H. Druce, 1898)

Synonyms
- Lepidarbela tacita H. Druce, 1898

Species of moth

Indarbela tacita is a moth in the family Cossidae first described by Herbert Druce in 1898. It is found in Honduras.
