= Methidathion =

Names
- Preferred IUPAC name S-[(5-Methoxy-2-oxo-1,3,4-thiadiazol-3(2H)-yl)methyl] O,O-dimethyl phosphorodithioate
- Other names Supracide, Ultracide, Suprathion

Identifiers
CAS Number	950-37-8
3D model (JSmol)	Interactive image
ChEBI	CHEBI:34837
ChEMBL	ChEMBL226651
ChemSpider	13115
ECHA InfoCard	100.012.227
KEGG	C14431
PubChem CID	13709
UNII	Y2P145U7KK
CompTox Dashboard (EPA)	DTXSID5020819
- InChI: InChI=1S/C6H11N2O4PS3/c1-10-5-7-8(6(9)16-5)4-15-13(14,11-2)12-3/h4H2,1-3H3 Key: MEBQXILRKZHVCX-UHFFFAOYSA-N; InChI=1/C6H11N2O4PS3/c1-10-5-7-8(6(9)16-5)4-15-13(14,11-2)12-3/h4H2,1-3H3 Key: MEBQXILRKZHVCX-UHFFFAOYAL
- SMILES: O=C1SC(=N/N1CSP(=S)(OC)OC)\OC

Properties
Chemical formula	C_{6}H_{11}N_{2}O_{4}PS_{3}
Molar mass	302.331 g/mol
- Except where otherwise noted, data are given for materials in their standard state (at 25 °C [77 °F], 100 kPa). verify (what is ?) Infobox references

Methidathion is an organophosphate insecticide; its use is banned in the European Union and USA.

Methidathion has been used as an insecticide in many countries to control caterpillars of Indarbela quadrinotata.

In 2012, residues were found in Thai vegetables at levels 100 times the legal limit. Thailand routinely uses many pesticides banned in the US and EU and in amounts far exceeding limits.
