= Indarbela millemaculata =

Scientific classification
- Kingdom: Animalia
- Phylum: Arthropoda
- Class: Insecta
- Order: Lepidoptera
- Family: Cossidae
- Genus: Indarbela
- Species: I. millemaculata

Binomial name
- Indarbela millemaculata (Hampson, 1897)

Synonyms
- Lepidarbela millemaculata Hampson, 1897

Species of moth

Indarbela millemaculata is a moth in the family Cossidae. It is found in India.
