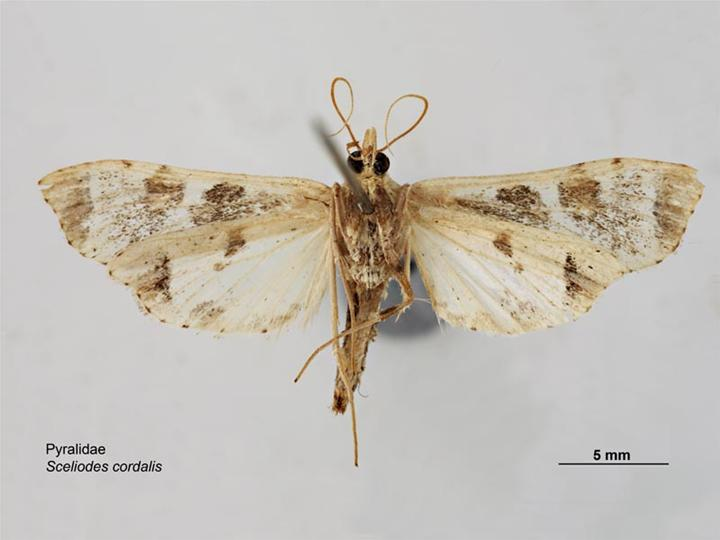

Scientific classification
- Kingdom: Animalia
- Phylum: Arthropoda
- Class: Insecta
- Order: Lepidoptera
- Family: Crambidae
- Genus: Noorda
- Species: N. diehlalis

Binomial name
- Noorda diehlalis Marion & Viette, 1956

= Noorda diehlalis =

Species of moth

Noorda diehlalis is a moth in the family Crambidae. It was described by Hubert Marion and Pierre Viette in 1956. It is found on Madagascar.
