= Indarbela norax =

Scientific classification
- Kingdom: Animalia
- Phylum: Arthropoda
- Class: Insecta
- Order: Lepidoptera
- Family: Cossidae
- Genus: Indarbela
- Species: I. norax

Binomial name
- Indarbela norax (H. Druce, 1898)

Synonyms
- Lepidarbela norax H. Druce, 1898

Species of moth

Indarbela norax is a moth in the family Cossidae first described by Herbert Druce in 1898. It is found in Mexico.
