= Indarbela dea =

Scientific classification
- Kingdom: Animalia
- Phylum: Arthropoda
- Class: Insecta
- Order: Lepidoptera
- Family: Cossidae
- Genus: Indarbela
- Species: I. dea

Binomial name
- Indarbela dea (C. Swinhoe, 1890)

Synonyms
- Arbela dea C. Swinhoe, 1890

Species of moth

Indarbela dea is a moth in the family Cossidae first described by Charles Swinhoe in 1890. It is found in Myanmar.
