= Indarbela nais =

Scientific classification
- Kingdom: Animalia
- Phylum: Arthropoda
- Clade: Pancrustacea
- Class: Insecta
- Order: Lepidoptera
- Family: Cossidae
- Genus: Indarbela
- Species: I. nais

Binomial name
- Indarbela nais (H. Druce, 1898)

Synonyms
- Lepidarbela nais H. Druce, 1898

Species of moth

Indarbela nais is a moth in the family Cossidae first described by Herbert Druce in 1898. It is found in Costa Rica.
