= Indarbela minima =

Scientific classification
- Kingdom: Animalia
- Phylum: Arthropoda
- Class: Insecta
- Order: Lepidoptera
- Family: Cossidae
- Genus: Indarbela
- Species: I. minima

Binomial name
- Indarbela minima (Hampson, 1910)

Synonyms
- Lepidarbela minima Hampson, 1910

Species of moth

Indarbela minima is a moth in the family Cossidae. It is found in Sri Lanka.
