= Noorda affinis =

Scientific classification
- Domain: Eukaryota
- Kingdom: Animalia
- Phylum: Arthropoda
- Class: Insecta
- Order: Lepidoptera
- Family: Crambidae
- Genus: Noorda
- Species: N. affinis

Binomial name
- Noorda affinis Rothschild, 1916

Species of moth

Noorda affinis is a moth in the family Crambidae. It was described by Rothschild in 1916. It is found in Papua New Guinea.
