= Indarbela discipuncta =

Scientific classification
- Kingdom: Animalia
- Phylum: Arthropoda
- Class: Insecta
- Order: Lepidoptera
- Family: Cossidae
- Genus: Indarbela
- Species: I. discipuncta

Binomial name
- Indarbela discipuncta (Wileman, 1915)

Synonyms
- Lepidarbela discipuncta Wileman, 1915

Species of moth

Indarbela discipuncta is a moth in the family Cossidae. It is found in Taiwan.
