= Indarbela orima =

Scientific classification
- Kingdom: Animalia
- Phylum: Arthropoda
- Class: Insecta
- Order: Lepidoptera
- Family: Cossidae
- Genus: Indarbela
- Species: I. orima

Binomial name
- Indarbela orima (H. Druce, 1906)

Synonyms
- Lepidarbela orima H. Druce, 1906

Species of moth

Indarbela orima is a moth in the family Cossidae. It is found in Peru and was first described by Herbert Druce in 1906.
