= Noorda aeanalis =

Scientific classification
- Domain: Eukaryota
- Kingdom: Animalia
- Phylum: Arthropoda
- Class: Insecta
- Order: Lepidoptera
- Family: Crambidae
- Genus: Noorda
- Species: N. aeanalis

Binomial name
- Noorda aeanalis West, 1931

Species of moth

Noorda aeanalis is a moth in the family Crambidae. It was described by West in 1931. It is found in the Philippines (Luzon).
