= Indarbela tegula =

Scientific classification
- Kingdom: Animalia
- Phylum: Arthropoda
- Class: Insecta
- Order: Lepidoptera
- Family: Cossidae
- Genus: Indarbela
- Species: I. tegula

Binomial name
- Indarbela tegula (Distant, 1897)

Synonyms
- Arbela tegula Distant, 1897; Altha tegula (Hampson, 1910)

Species of moth

Indarbela tegula is a moth in the family Cossidae. It is found in South Africa and Zambia.
