= Squamura celebensis =

Scientific classification
- Kingdom: Animalia
- Phylum: Arthropoda
- Class: Insecta
- Order: Lepidoptera
- Family: Cossidae
- Genus: Squamura
- Species: S. celebensis

Binomial name
- Squamura celebensis Roepke, 1957

Species of moth

Squamura celebensis is a moth in the family Cossidae. It is found on Sulawesi.
