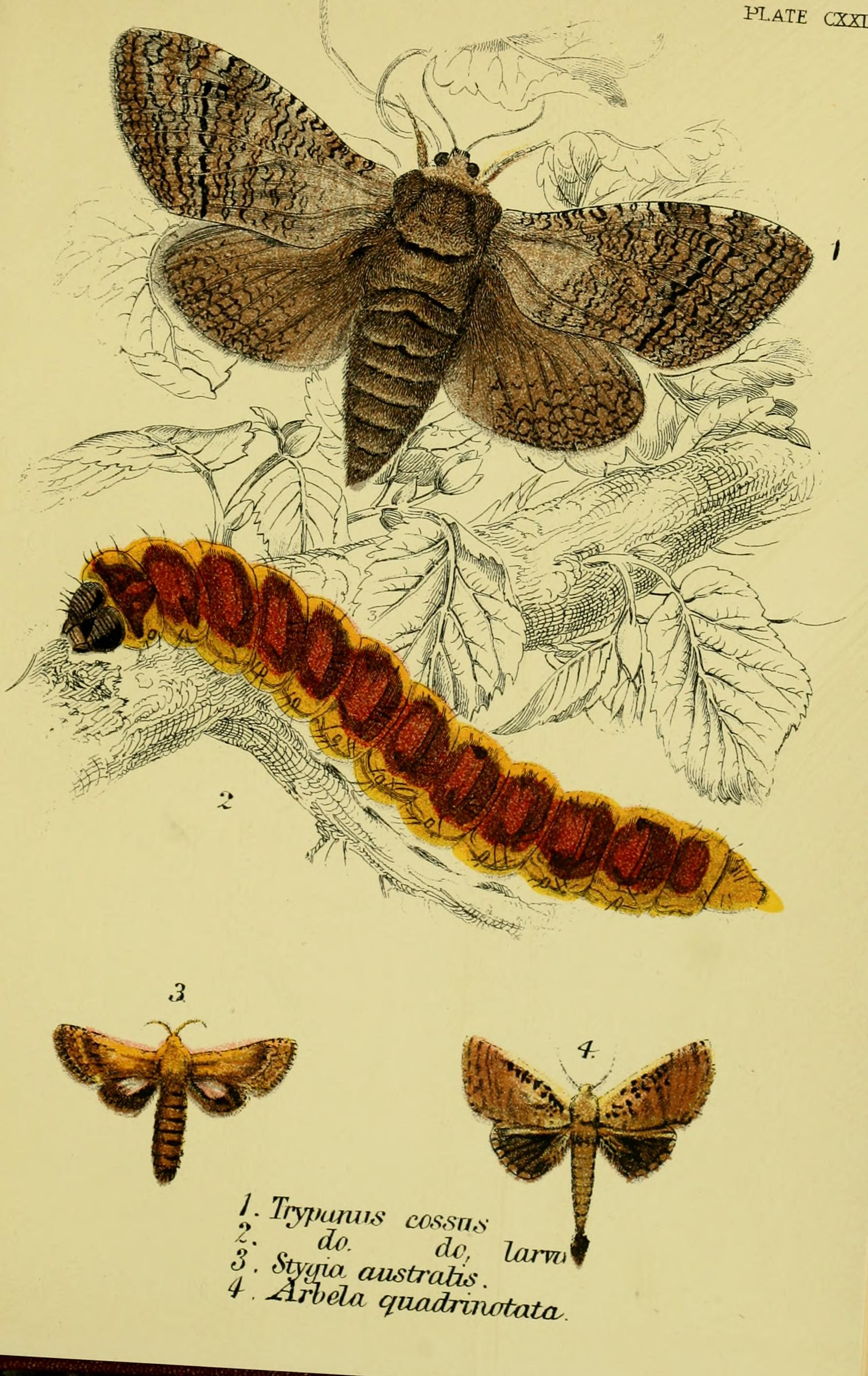

Scientific classification
- Kingdom: Animalia
- Phylum: Arthropoda
- Class: Insecta
- Order: Lepidoptera
- Family: Cossidae
- Genus: Indarbela
- Species: I. quadrinotata

Binomial name
- Indarbela quadrinotata (Walker, 1856)

Synonyms
- Arbela quadrinotata Walker, 1856; Cossus quadrinotata Walker, 1856; Cossus abruptus Walker, 1865

= Indarbela quadrinotata =

Bark-eating caterpillar

Species of moth

Indarbela quadrinotata, the bark-eating caterpillar, is a moth in the family Cossidae. It is found in India and Sri Lanka. It was described by Francis Walker in 1856.

== Description ==
In the male, the head and thorax are rufus in color. Forewings pale rufus with a numerous dark rufus bands of strigae. A spot at the end of the cell is present and those between the median nervure and vein 1b is more prominent. Abdomen and hindwings are fuscous. In the female, the head, thorax and abdomen are ochreous white. Forewings are also ochreous white with markings as in male. Hindwings pale, slightly suffused with fuscous with numerous obsolescent brown striage. Caterpillars are pinkish white with brown spots. Pupae are chestnut brown in color. Eggs oval in shape and reddish.

== Ecology ==
The caterpillar is a serious pest that attacks more than 30 crops. The larva bores into the trunk or branches about 15–25 cm deep. The tunnel created is empty in the day time, but is filled with caterpillar during the night. It damages the bark of the tree resulting in dieback of the stem. Frass is visible in affected areas.

Crops that are readily attacked by the pest are: Albizia lebbeck, Albizia procera, Anacardium occidentale, Camellia sinensis, Cassia fistula, Chloroxylon swietenia, Citrus reticulata, Citrus sinensis, Citrus × paradisi, Corymbia citriodora, Eriobotrya japonica, Eucalyptus camaldulensis, Falcataria moluccana, Ficus benghalensis, Ficus carica, Gmelina arborea, Grewia asiatica, Hevea brasiliensis, Litchi chinensis, Mangifera indica, Manilkara zapota, Mimusops elengi, Mitragyna parvifolia, Moringa oleifera, Morus alba, Phyllanthus emblica, Populus deltoides, Prunus armeniaca, Psidium guajava, Punica granatum, Sesbania cannabina, Syzygium cumini, Tectona grandis, Terminalia arjuna, Theobroma cacao, and Ziziphus mauritiana.

Control mainly takes place in the egg or larval stages. They can be chemically controlled by applying methidathion. Clones of Casuarina are known to show tolerance and resistance to caterpillars.
