= Noorda atripalpalis =

Scientific classification
- Domain: Eukaryota
- Kingdom: Animalia
- Phylum: Arthropoda
- Class: Insecta
- Order: Lepidoptera
- Family: Crambidae
- Genus: Noorda
- Species: N. atripalpalis

Binomial name
- Noorda atripalpalis Zerny in Rebel & Zerny, 1917

Species of moth

Noorda atripalpalis is a moth in the family Crambidae. It was described by Zerny in 1917. It is found in Sudan.
