= Indarbela necreros =

Scientific classification
- Kingdom: Animalia
- Phylum: Arthropoda
- Class: Insecta
- Order: Lepidoptera
- Family: Cossidae
- Genus: Indarbela
- Species: I. necreros

Binomial name
- Indarbela necreros (Dyar, 1914)

Synonyms
- Lepidarbela necreros Dyar, 1914

Species of moth

Indarbela necreros is a moth in the family Cossidae. It is found in Panama.
