= Noorda arfakensis =

Scientific classification
- Domain: Eukaryota
- Kingdom: Animalia
- Phylum: Arthropoda
- Class: Insecta
- Order: Lepidoptera
- Family: Crambidae
- Genus: Noorda
- Species: N. arfakensis

Binomial name
- Noorda arfakensis Kenrick, 1912

Species of moth

Noorda arfakensis is a moth in the family Crambidae. It was described by George Hamilton Kenrick in 1912. It is found in Western New Guinea, Indonesia.
