= Noorda unipunctalis =

Scientific classification
- Domain: Eukaryota
- Kingdom: Animalia
- Phylum: Arthropoda
- Class: Insecta
- Order: Lepidoptera
- Family: Crambidae
- Genus: Noorda
- Species: N. unipunctalis

Binomial name
- Noorda unipunctalis Amsel, 1963

Species of moth

Noorda unipunctalis is a moth in the family Crambidae. It was described by Hans Georg Amsel in 1963. It is found in Ethiopia.
