= Noorda trimaculalis =

Scientific classification
- Domain: Eukaryota
- Kingdom: Animalia
- Phylum: Arthropoda
- Class: Insecta
- Order: Lepidoptera
- Family: Crambidae
- Genus: Noorda
- Species: N. trimaculalis

Binomial name
- Noorda trimaculalis Amsel, 1965

Species of moth

Noorda trimaculalis is a moth in the family Crambidae. It was described by Hans Georg Amsel in 1965. It is found in Ethiopia.
