= Squamura roepkei =

Scientific classification
- Kingdom: Animalia
- Phylum: Arthropoda
- Clade: Pancrustacea
- Class: Insecta
- Order: Lepidoptera
- Family: Cossidae
- Genus: Squamura
- Species: S. roepkei

Binomial name
- Squamura roepkei Holloway, 1982

Species of moth

Squamura roepkei is a moth in the family Cossidae. It is found on Peninsular Malaysia, Sumatra, Java and Borneo. The habitat consists of lowland areas.
