= Noorda anthophilalis =

Scientific classification
- Kingdom: Animalia
- Phylum: Arthropoda
- Clade: Pancrustacea
- Class: Insecta
- Order: Lepidoptera
- Family: Crambidae
- Genus: Noorda
- Species: N. anthophilalis

Binomial name
- Noorda anthophilalis Strand, 1909

Species of moth

Noorda anthophilalis is a moth in the family Crambidae. It was described by Strand in 1909. It is found in Tanzania.
