= Indarbela phaga =

Scientific classification
- Kingdom: Animalia
- Phylum: Arthropoda
- Class: Insecta
- Order: Lepidoptera
- Family: Cossidae
- Genus: Indarbela
- Species: I. phaga

Binomial name
- Indarbela phaga (C. Swinhoe, 1894)

Synonyms
- Lepidarbela phaga C. Swinhoe, 1894

Species of moth

Indarbela phaga is a moth in the family Cossidae first described by Charles Swinhoe in 1894. It is found in India.
