= Squamura disciplaga =

Scientific classification
- Kingdom: Animalia
- Phylum: Arthropoda
- Class: Insecta
- Order: Lepidoptera
- Family: Cossidae
- Genus: Squamura
- Species: S. disciplaga

Binomial name
- Squamura disciplaga (C. Swinhoe, 1901)

Synonyms
- Lepidarbela disciplaga C. Swinhoe, 1901; Arbela disciplaga; Indarbela disciplaga

Species of moth

Squamura disciplaga is a moth in the family Cossidae first described by Charles Swinhoe in 1901. It is found on Sarawak, Borneo, Peninsular Malaysia, Sumatra and in the Philippines. The habitat consists of lowland areas.

The larvae have been recorded boring in the trunk of Persea species and have also been found on Citrus species.
