= Chadachadi =

Vegetable dish in Bengali cuisine

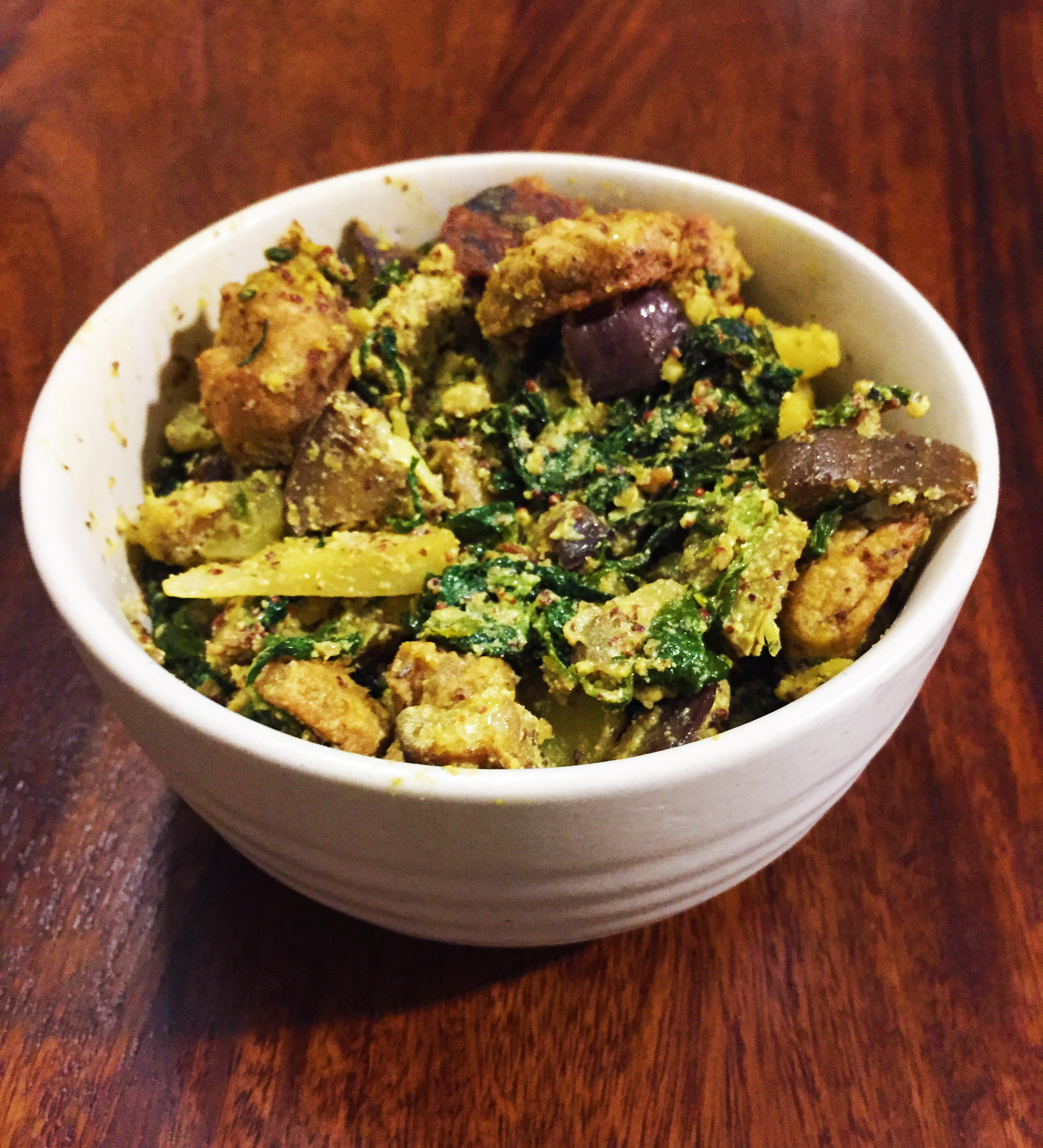
Chadachadi

Chaṛachaṛi (Odia: ଚଡ଼ଚଡ଼ି)/ Chorchori (Bengali: চচ্চড়ি) is a unique char-flavored mixed vegetable dish of India and Bangladesh, found primarily in Odia and Bengali cuisine of the Indian subcontinent.

== Origin ==
Chorchori is often cooked with leftover vegetables at the end of the week. The story behind the dish is that in Bengali households, traditionally men would go grocery shopping once a week. At the end of the week, the household would be left with bits of all the vegetables bought earlier in the week.

== Preparation ==
To cook chorchori, a chaunk is prepared by frying spices such as black mustard seeds and minced ginger root in oil or ghee. Often, panch phoron is used. Then, chopped vegetables are added and stir-fried briefly. Water, salt, and more spices are added, and the vegetables are allowed to simmer.

Once all the liquid has been absorbed and cooked off, the vegetables begin to fry in the oil or ghee left in the bottom of the pot. As the vegetables begin to char, a sizzling sound is heard, and the pot is removed from the heat.

After a few minutes, the thin charred crust is stirred gently into the dish.

Typical vegetables used for chadachadi include potatoes, eggplant, spinach, French beans, and cauliflower.

== See also ==
- Oriya cuisine
- Bengali cuisine
