= Indarbela naida =

Scientific classification
- Kingdom: Animalia
- Phylum: Arthropoda
- Class: Insecta
- Order: Lepidoptera
- Family: Cossidae
- Genus: Indarbela
- Species: I. naida

Binomial name
- Indarbela naida (Dyar, 1913)

Synonyms
- Lepidarbela naida Dyar, 1913

Species of moth

Indarbela naida is a moth in the family Cossidae. It is found in Mexico.
