= Squamura kinabalua =

Scientific classification
- Kingdom: Animalia
- Phylum: Arthropoda
- Clade: Pancrustacea
- Class: Insecta
- Order: Lepidoptera
- Family: Cossidae
- Genus: Squamura
- Species: S. kinabalua

Binomial name
- Squamura kinabalua (Holloway, 1976)

Synonyms
- Indarbela kinabalua Holloway, 1976

Species of moth

Squamura kinabalua is a moth in the family Cossidae. It is found on Borneo. The habitat consists of upper montane forests.
