= Viettessa villiersi =

Scientific classification
- Kingdom: Animalia
- Phylum: Arthropoda
- Class: Insecta
- Order: Lepidoptera
- Family: Crambidae
- Genus: Viettessa
- Species: V. villiersi

Binomial name
- Viettessa villiersi (Marion, 1957)

Synonyms
- Noorda villiersi Marion, 1957

Species of moth

Viettessa villiersi is a moth in the family Crambidae. It was described by Hubert Marion in 1957. It is found in Benin.
