= Squamura maculata =

Scientific classification
- Kingdom: Animalia
- Phylum: Arthropoda
- Class: Insecta
- Order: Lepidoptera
- Family: Cossidae
- Genus: Squamura
- Species: S. maculata

Binomial name
- Squamura maculata Heylaerts, 1890

Synonyms
- Arbela flavina Mell, 1923; Indarbela flavina; Squamura sumatrana Roepke, 1957

Species of moth

Squamura maculata is a moth in the family Cossidae. It is found on Sumatra, Borneo, Java and possibly in Cambodia. The habitat consists of lowland and lower montane forests.
