= Indarbela obliquifasciata =

Scientific classification
- Kingdom: Animalia
- Phylum: Arthropoda
- Class: Insecta
- Order: Lepidoptera
- Family: Cossidae
- Genus: Indarbela
- Species: I. obliquifasciata

Binomial name
- Indarbela obliquifasciata (Mell, 1923)

Synonyms
- Arbela obliquifasciata Mell, 1923; Arbela grisescens Mell, 1923; Squamura obliquifasciata

Species of moth

Indarbela obliquifasciata is a moth in the family Cossidae. It is found in China (Guangdong, Hong Kong).
