= Squamura acutistriata =

Scientific classification
- Kingdom: Animalia
- Phylum: Arthropoda
- Class: Insecta
- Order: Lepidoptera
- Family: Cossidae
- Genus: Squamura
- Species: S. acutistriata

Binomial name
- Squamura acutistriata (Mell, 1923)

Synonyms
- Arbela acutistriata Mell, 1923; Indarbela acutistriata

Species of moth

Squamura acutistriata is a moth in the family Cossidae. It is found on Java and possibly Borneo.
