= Google Street View in Africa =

In Africa, Google Street View is available in Botswana, Uganda South Africa, Kenya, Eswatini, Lesotho, São Tomé and Príncipe, Senegal, Ghana, Tunisia, Nigeria, Rwanda, Namibia, and three Spanish territories: the Canary Islands, Ceuta, and Melilla. It is also sparsely available for a small number of select locations in Mali, Tanzania, Egypt, and Madagascar.

== Background ==
On September 1, 2009, Google announced that it started collecting images in South Africa for Google Maps Street View. Google is currently driving around South Africa in Toyota Priuses, taking photographs of locations in the cities of Johannesburg, Pretoria, Cape Town, Port Elizabeth, Durban and East London. Google Trikes are also being used for the first time to map popular tourist destinations, such as the scenic Chapman's Peak Drive and Table Mountain in Cape Town, Soccer City in Johannesburg, and the new Moses Mabhida Stadium in Durban. Images of South Africa were made available on Google Street View on June 8, 2010.

On December 8, 2010, more locations in South Africa were added. These were mostly rural and main roads, as well as a much larger coverage of the Limpopo province. After the update, the borders of South Africa's neighboring countries could be reached.

On November 27, 2012, Botswana was added.

On March 18, 2013, Tanzania was added.

On April 23, 2013, Lesotho was added.

On September 20, 2013, Eswatini was added.

On April 21, 2014, more locations in Lesotho and Botswana were added.

On September 9, 2014, landmarks in Egypt were added.

On February 18, 2014, more locations in South Africa were added.

On May 6, 2015, Madagascar was added.

On September 15, 2015, landmarks in Kenya were added.

On October 8, 2015, Uganda was added.

On February 8, 2017, Ghana, Senegal and landmarks in Uganda were added.

On March 18, 2017, Tunisia was added.

On July 27, 2017, Nigeria was added.

On January 12, 2019, landmarks in Mali was added

On July 25, 2018, landmarks in Nigeria were added.

On October 4, 2018, Kenya was added.

On July 24, 2019, more locations in Nigeria were added.

In October 2022, more locations in Kenya were added. More locations were also added in Senegal and Nigeria. Later in the same month, the first official footage was added for Rwanda was added, this can be only be found in the capital Kigali for now. A generation four camera was used for coverage of all these countries.

On June 4, 2025, Namibia was added.

On June 12, 2026, updated coverage of Ghana was released, which covered the majority of main roads in the country, including the previously uncovered Tumu-Hamile road on the border with Burkina Faso, and more thorough coverage of the cities of Accra and Kumasi. Google also released coverage around the tourist hotspot Songhor Lagoon in the southeast of the country.

== Introductions by year ==
2009	Islands of Gran Canaria and Santa Cruz de Tenerife in Spain
2010	South Africa: Johannesburg, Soweto, Roodepoort, Krugersdorp, Randfontein, Kempton Park, Benoni, Vosloorus, Katlehong, Centurion, Pretoria, Bronkhorstspruit, Midrand, Middelburg, Vanderbijlpark, Sasolburg, Heidelberg, Kroonstad, Welkom, Kimberley, Pietermaritzburg, Mbombela, Ermelo, Pinetown, Kingsburgh, Mdantsane, King William's Town, Port Alfred, Grahamstown, Cape Town, Kuils River, Mitchells Plain, Fish Hoek, Somerset West, Durbanville, Kraaifontein, Stellenbosch, Melkbosstrand, Kleinmond, Durban, Port Elizabeth, East London, Bloemfontein, Polokwane, Nelspruit, Rustenburg, Johannesburg Zoo, Apartheid Museum, Boulders Beach, Company's Gardens, Kirstenbosch National Botanical Garden, Walter Sisulu National Botanical Garden, World Cup 2010 Venues
2011	La Gomera, El Hierro islands in Spain
2012	Botswana: Gaborone, Francistown, Maun, Molepolole, Kasane, Serowe, Lobatse, Tlokweng, Ramotswa, Kanye, Selebi-Phikwe, Mahalapye, Bobonong, Thamaga, Letlhakane, Palapye
2013	Eswatini: Mbabane, Manzini, Mhlume, Big Bend and other locations in Eswatini; Teyateyaneng, Butha-Buthe, Hlotse, Mokhotlong, Qacha's Nek and more locations in Lesotho; Tanzania:Uhuru Peak, Lava Tower, Moir hut, Arrow Glacier camp, Lemosho-clearings, Shira Camp & Gombe National Park
2014	Egypt: Landmarks including Pyramids of Giza, Cairo Citadel, Saqqara, Monastery of Saint Mina, Citadel of Qaitbay and more Gombe Stream National Park in Tanzania
2015	(Madagascar) Landmarks and water views of Barren Isles, Nosy Komba, Sambirano River, Ambalahonko, Velondriake; Samburu National Reserve, Lewa Wildlife Conservancy, Marania Farm and Sheldrick Elephant Orphanage in Kenya; Kampala, Entebbe and more locations in Uganda. Robben Island Museum, in South Africa
2016	Saint-Denis and more locations in Réunion; Kruger National Park in South Africa
2017	Accra, Kumasi, Cape Coast, Takoradi, Obuasi, Tamale, Wa in Ghana; Dakar, Thies, Saint-Louis, Touba, Diourbel in Senegal; Queen Elizabeth National Park, Lake Mburo National Park, Kibale Forest National Park, Semuliki National Park, Murchison Falls National Park, Mount Elgon National Park and Kidepo Valley National Park, in Uganda; Tunis*, Bizerte*, Nabeul*, Hammamet*, Sousse*, Monastir*, Al-Qayrawan* El Jem*, Sfax*, Gabes* Djerba* and more locations in Tunisia; Lagos, Ikeja, Ojo, Lekki, Ikorodu*, Epe, Badagry and more locations in Lagos State, Nigeria (South Africa) Albertinia
2018	Lekki Conservation Centre, Abuja Millennium Park, Freedom Park, Royal Niger Company Flag, National Museum of Lagos, Olumo Rock, National Children's Park and Zoo, Tinubu Square, Mount Patti and Abuja Panoramic View, in Nigeria; Nairobi, Mombasa, Kisumu, Naivasha, Nakuru, Eldoret, Ruiru, Malindi, Mariakani, Kisili and more locations in Kenya
2019	Abuja, Ibadan, Enugu, and Benin city were extensively covered in Nigeria (Kenya) Nairobi National Museum, Nairobi Gallery, Malindi Museum, Meru Museum, Nyeri Museum, Fort Jesus
2020	(South Africa) Wits University Origins Centre (Nigeria) Yemisi Shyllon Museum of Art, Rele Art Gallery, Terra Kulture & African Artists' Foundation
2025	(Namibia) Grootfontein, Karasburg, Katima Mulilo, Keetmanshoop, Lüderitz, Okahandja, Ondangwa, Oranjemund, Oshakati, Outjo, Rehoboth, Rundu, Swakopmund, Sossusvlei, Tsumeb, Walvis Bay, Windhoek
2026	(Ghana) Kumasi, Accra, Songhor Lagoon, Tema

== Areas included ==
=== Botswana ===
District	Most coverage (Note: Settlement has most or all roads mapped)	Some coverage (Note: Settlement has many roads covered, but some areas still missing)	Very limited coverage (Note: Settlement has only a few roads mapped, for example only the main street)
Central	Letlhakane, Palapye		Bobonong, Mahalapye, Selibe Phikwe, Serowe
Kweneng	Gabane		Molepolole, Thamaga
North-East	Francistown		
North-West	Maun		
Southern			Jwaneng, Kanye
South-East	Gaborone, Ramotswa, Tlokweng		Lobatse

=== Egypt ===
Area
Landmarks in Egypt including Pyramids of Giza, Cairo Citadel, Saqqara, Monastery of Saint Mina, Citadel of Qaitbay and more.

=== Eswatini ===
Area
Most cities and roads.

=== France ===
Most roads in Réunion.

=== Ghana ===
Main roads and several cities throughout the country

=== Kenya ===
District	Most coverage	Some coverage	Very limited coverage
Central	Nairobi, Thika		Machakos, Athi River
Coast	Mombasa		Kilifi, Malindi
Rift Valley	Nakuru, Eldoret		Naivasha, Narok
Nyanza	Kisumu		

Samburu National Reserve, Lewa Wildlife Conservancy, parts of Marania Farm near Mount Kenya

=== Lesotho ===
Western half of the country: Maseru and major roads.

=== Madagascar ===
Landmarks: Avenue of the Baobabs, Rova of Antananarivo

Water views of Barren Isles, Nosy Komba, Sambirano River, Ambalahonko, Velondriake, Avenue of the Baobabs, and the Sacred Forest.

There is a limited street view on just a few roads in the towns of Ambanja, Belo sur Mer and Morondava.

=== Mali ===
Region	Major cities/areas
Bamako	Hamdallaye
Djenne	Great Mosque of Djenne
Tombouctou	Mosque Sankore; Djinguereber Mosque; Mosquée de Sidi Yahia
Bandiagara	Bandiagara Cliffs

=== Namibia ===
Area
Main roads and cities throughout the country.

=== Nigeria ===
Most major cities like Abuja, Benin City, Enugu, Kano, Ibadan, Lagos and surroundings, roads between.

=== Portugal ===
In Madeira (which geographically belongs to Africa according to geographical definitions: closest mainland), most towns, cities, villages, major and rural roads are covered.

In the Azores (which have a location with little more unclear connection to a continent), the islands of São Miguel Island and Terceira Island have good coverage.

=== Rwanda ===
In October 2022, Google released official coverage in the capital Kigali, and this adds a new country to Street View. Google used a generation four camera to capture this footage with. Cities such as Byumba, Nyagatare and Rwamagana were added afterwards.

=== São Tomé and Príncipe ===
Coverage extends to most towns, cities, villages, major and rural roads on both major islands.

=== South Africa ===
Province	Most coverage	Some coverage	Very limited coverage
Gauteng	Johannesburg, Dainfern, Pretoria, Benoni, Germiston, Krugersdorp, Kempton Park, Nigel, Springs, Centurion, Bronkhorstspruit, Carletonville, Westonaria, Hillshaven, Lenasia, Heidelberg, Roodepoort, Vereeniging, Vanderbijlpark, Laudium	Chartwell, Soweto, Vosloorus	Drie Ziek, Kagiso, Katlehong, Hammanskraal
Mpumalanga	Witbank, Middelburg, Nelspruit, Ermelo	Embalenhle	Amersfoort, Secunda, Bethal, Badplaas, Balfour, Lydenburg, Malelane, Hectorspruit, Komatipoort, Machadodorp, Waterval-Boven, Hendrina, Barberton, Standerton, Volksrust
Limpopo	Polokwane		Vaalwater, Louis Trichardt, Musina, Thabazimbi, Thohoyandou, Tzaneen, Haenertsburg, Northam, Mookgopong, Modimolle, Bela-Bela, Roedtan, Settlers,
Free State	Bloemfontein, Welkom, Kroonstad, Sasolburg, Clarens, Vaalpark, Riebeekstad	Thabong, Mangaung	Koppies, Viljoenskroon, Bultfontein, Dealesville, Deneysville, Oranjeville, Villiers, Memel, Harrismith, Kestell, Bethlehem, Paul Roux, Senekal, Virginia, Hennenman, Ventersburg, Wesselbron, Odendaalsrus, Smithfield
North-West	Rustenburg, Brits, Mooinooi	Klerksdorp, Orkney, Stilfontein	Potchefstroom, Mafikeng, Bloemhof, Christiana, Stilfontein, Ventersdorp, Derby, Wolmaranstad, Modderspruit, Phokeng, Swartruggens, Zeerust, 'Ottoshoop, Geysdorp, Delareyville, Sannieshof, Coligny
KwaZulu-Natal	Durban, Newcastle, Pietermartizburg, Ladysmith, Vryheid, Chatsworth, Berea, Richard's Bay	Dundee, Paulpietersburg, Mooi River, Mpumalanga	Glencoe, Bergville, Winterton, Estcourt, Umlazi, KwaDukuza, Empangeni, Louwsburg
Western Cape	Cape Town, Mitchells Plain, Blue Downs, Heidelberg, Simon's Town, Knysna, Plettenberg Bay, Strand, Grabouw, Stellenbosch, Nature's Valley, Somerset-West, Worcester	Khayalitsha, Dennekruin, Paarl, Sedgefield,	Laingsburg, Prince Albert Road, Beaufort West, Hermanus, George, Kwanokuthula
Northern Cape	Kimberley		Douglas, Prieska, Strydenburg, Hopetown, Colesberg
Eastern Cape	Port Elizabeth, East London, Grahamstown, Queenstown, Stutterheim, Aliwal North, Mdantsane, King William's Town, Bhisho, Middelburg, Cradock, Adelaide, Fort Beaufort, Alice, Lady Grey, Middeldrift	Elliot, Ugie, KwaNonzame, Midros, Rosmead, Lingelihle, Michausdal, Bedford, Mpolweni	Steynsburg

- Landmarks: Apartheid Museum, Johannesburg Zoo

=== Senegal ===
Area
Main roads and several cities throughout the country.

=== Spain ===
The Canary Islands do geographically belong to Africa according to geographical definitions (closest mainland).

Most towns, cities, villages, major and rural roads in the Canary Islands are covered. Ceuta and Melilla have some coverage.

=== Tanzania ===
- Mount Kilimanjaro National Park and some nearby spots and Gombe national park

=== Tunisia ===
Area
The coastal main road and selected streets in cities along it, including Tunis and Sfax.

=== Uganda ===
Area
Uganda has views of most roads inside and around Entebbe and Kampala.

== Unofficial coverage ==
- Zimbabwe: Views of some highways and the central business districts of Harare, Chegutu, Rusape, Masvingo, and two United Nations World Heritage Sites: Great Zimbabwe National Monument and Victoria Falls. The first instances of Google Street View in Zimbabwe were contributed by photographer Tawanda Kanhema.
- Liberia: Partial coverage of Monrovia
- Gambia: Partial coverage of Banjul, Serekunda, and Bakau.

== Future Coverage ==
- Ethiopia
