= Morombe District =

Morombe (district)
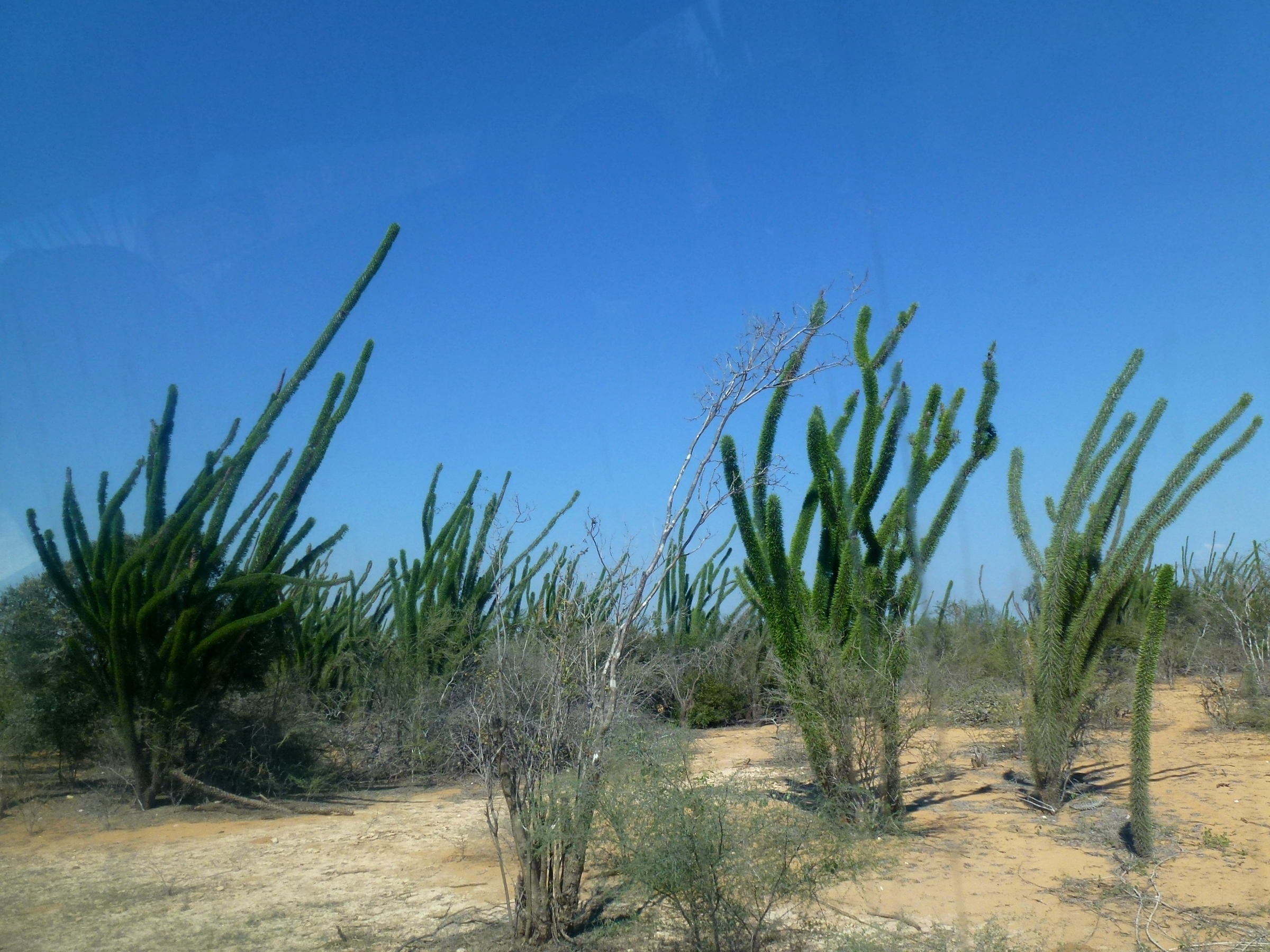
- a Didierea in Andombiry, Morombe

- Location in Madagascar
- Coordinates: 21°45′S 43°22′E
- Country: Madagascar
- Region: Atsimo-Andrefana
- District: Morombe

Area
  - Total: 7,784 km^{2} (3,005 sq mi)
- Elevation: 7 m (23 ft)

Population (2020)
  - Total: 231,431
  - Density: 29.73/km^{2} (77.00/sq mi)
  - Ethnicities: Vezo
- Time zone: UTC3 (EAT)
- Postal code: 618

Morombe is a district of Atsimo-Andrefana in Madagascar. It can be reached by the National road 55 or pirogue from Morondava. It is situated at 283 km from Tulear. The district has an area of 7,784 km^{2} (3,005 sq mi), and the estimated population in 2020 was 231,431.

An airport serves the town.

== Television ==
For 17 years now there is no television available in Morombe. At the time the transmitter broke down, the director took it to Tulear and later to Antananarivo but it was never returned.

== Municipalities ==
The district is further divided into eight municipalities:

- Ambahikily
- Antanimeva
- Antongo Vaovao
- Basibasy
- Befandefa
- Befandriana Sud
- Morombe
- Nosy Ambositra

== Baobab d'Andombiry ==
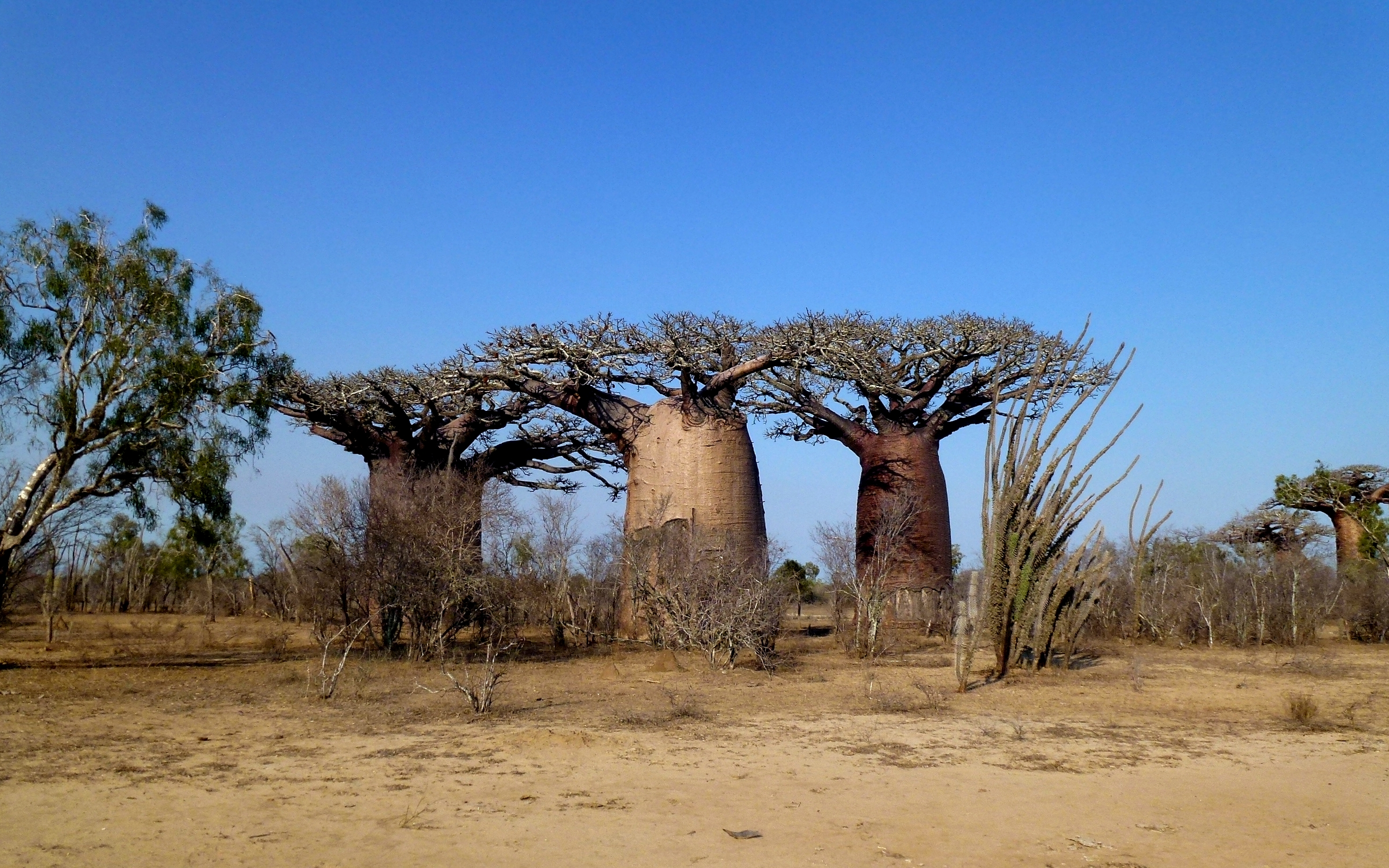
Three Brothers Baobab in Andombiry, Morombe

The largest baobab in this world is found in the village of Belintsaka, 23 km from Morombe. It has a circumference of almost 28m. There are more than 6000 adult baobabs alone in the forest of Andombiry of which 30 specimen are very large, with a circumference of more than 20m.

== See also ==
- Morondava
- Kirindy Mitea National Park
- Mikea Forest
- Roman Catholic Diocese of Morombe
- Andavadoaka, a village of this district
