= Manja =

Manja may refer to:

== Places ==
- Manja, India, a town in India
- Manja, Jordan, a town in Jordan
- Manja, Madagascar, a town in Madagascar
- Manja District, a district in Madagascar

== People ==
- Manja Kowalski (born 1976), German rower
- Manja Schüle (born 1976), German politician
- Manja Smits (harpist), Dutch harpist and 1993 winner of the Nederlandse Muziekprijs
- Manja Smits (politician) (born 1985), Dutch politician

== Other uses ==
- Manja (kite), the glass powder coated kite flying and fighting string
- Manja (magazine), a Singaporean magazine
- Manja (film), a 2014 Indian film
- Manja (novel), a 1938 novel by Anna Gmeyner

== See also ==
- Mandja (disambiguation)
- Manjaa, a woven bed
