= Beharona =

- Location in Madagascar
- Coordinates: 21°31′S 44°18′E
- Country: Madagascar
- Region: Menabe
- District: Manja
- Elevation: 242 m (794 ft)

Population (2001)
  - Total: 14,000
- Time zone: UTC3 (EAT)
- Postal code: 616

Beharona is a town and commune (Malagasy: kaominina) in Madagascar. It belongs to the district of Manja, which is a part of Menabe Region. The population of the commune was estimated to be approximately 14,000 in 2001 commune census.

Only primary schooling is available. It is also a site of industrial-scale mining. The majority 70% of the population of the commune are farmers, while an additional 30% receives their livelihood from raising livestock. The most important crop is rice, while other important products are maize, cassava and lima beans.

== Nature ==
The Kirindy Mitea National Park is situated in this municipality, along with the neighboring towns of Ankiliabo and Andranopasy.

== Rivers ==
The Mangoky River and the Sakalava River.

== Ethnics ==
The majority of its population belong to the Sakalava tribe but also Betsileo, Antanosy and Merina live in this municipality.
