= Antanimeva =

- Location in Madagascar
- Coordinates: 22°14′S 43°46′E
- Country: Madagascar
- Region: Atsimo-Andrefana
- District: Morombe
- Elevation: 145 m (476 ft)

Population (2001)
  - Total: 24,000
- Time zone: UTC3 (EAT)

Antanimeva is a town and commune in Madagascar. It belongs to the district of Morombe, which is a part of Atsimo-Andrefana Region. The population of the commune was estimated to be approximately 24,000 in 2001 commune census.

Primary and junior level secondary education are available in town. The majority 50% of the population of the commune are farmers, while an additional 47% receives their livelihood from raising livestock. The most important crop is rice, while other important products are cotton, maize and cassava. Services provide employment for 3% of the population.

== Roads ==
The commune is crossed by the RN9 from Toliara (Tulear) to Mandabe.
