= Anontsibe Centre =

- Location in Madagascar
- Coordinates: 21°22′S 44°28′E
- Country: Madagascar
- Region: Menabe
- District: Manja
- Elevation: 333 m (1,093 ft)

Population (2001)
  - Total: 10,000
- Time zone: UTC3 (EAT)

Anontsibe Centre or Anontsibe Sakalava is a town and commune (Malagasy: kaominina) in Madagascar. It belongs to the district of Manja, which is a part of Menabe Region. The population of the commune was estimated to be approximately 10,000 in 2001 commune census.

Only primary schooling is available. The majority, 99% of the commune's population are farmers, while an additional 1% receives their livelihood from raising livestock. The most important crops are rice and onions, while other important agricultural products are maize and lima beans.
