= Route nationale 9 (Madagascar) =

Road in Madagascar

Location
- Country: Madagascar

Highway system
- Roads in Madagascar

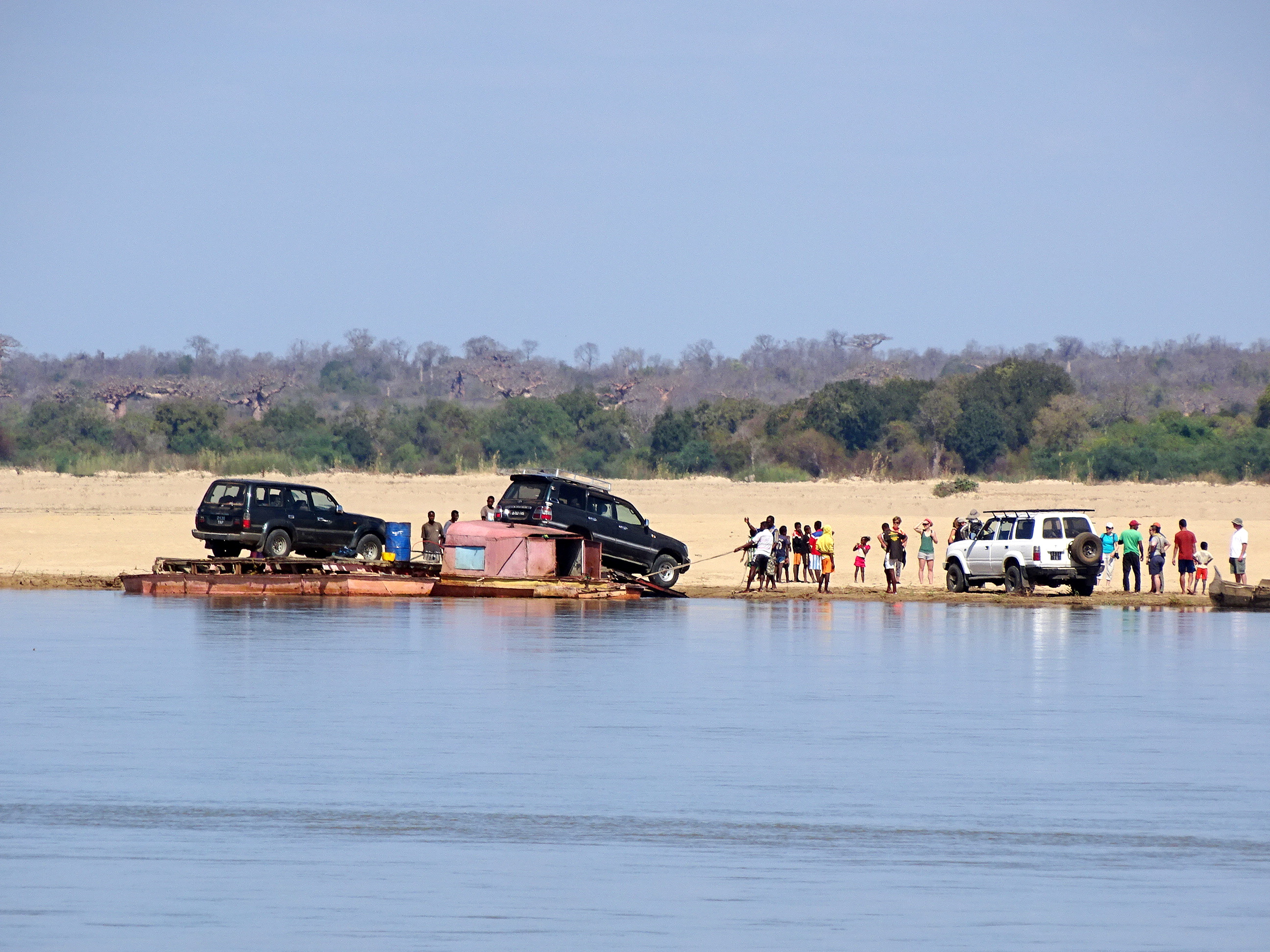
Crossing the Mangoky River

Route nationale 9 (RN 9) is a secondary highway in Madagascar of 382 km, running from Toliara to Mandabe. It crosses the regions of Menabe and Atsimo-Andrefana.

The section between Toliara and Analamisampy of 107 km had been paved recently. In 2025 the pavement of the remaining 165 km between Analamisampy and Manja was completed.

Also over the Mangoky river a bridge will be constructed. It will be the longest bridge of Madagascar with 880 m.

== Selected locations on route ==
(north to south)

- Morondava (RN 34, junction between Mahabo and Mahamby)
- Mandabe
- Maharivo River crossing
- Manja
- near Tanambao Ambony/Ankatsakatsa Sud - Mangoky River crossing and Lake Ihotry

-intersection with RN55 to Morombe

- Befandriana Sud
- Antanimeva
- Manombo River crossing near Ambalavenoka
- Reniala Reserve
- Ifaty
- Fiherenana River crossing
- Toliara (Tuléar)

== See also ==
- List of roads in Madagascar
- Transport in Madagascar
