= Andranopasy =

- Location in Madagascar
- Coordinates: 21°17′S 43°44′E
- Country: Madagascar
- Region: Menabe
- District: Manja
- Elevation: 5 m (16 ft)

Population (2001)
  - Total: 10,000
- Time zone: UTC3 (EAT)
- Postal code: 616

Andranopasy is a municipality on the west coast of Madagascar. It belongs to the district of Manja, which is a part of Menabe Region. The population of the commune was estimated to be approximately 10,000 in 2001 commune census.

Primary and junior level secondary education are available in town. The majority 75% of the population of the commune are farmers, while an additional 5% receives their livelihood from raising livestock. The most important crop is lima beans, while other important products are peas, beans and maize. Additionally fishing employs 20% of the population.

== Nature ==
The Kirindy Mitea National Park is situated in this municipality together with its neighboring towns of Beharona and Ankiliabo.

== Rivers ==
The delta of the Mangoky River is situated south of this municipality.
