= Analamisampy =

- Location in Madagascar
- Coordinates: 22°28′S 43°39′E
- Country: Madagascar
- Region: Atsimo-Andrefana
- District: Toliara II

Area
  - Total: 700 km^{2} (270 sq mi)
  - Land: 700 km^{2} (270 sq mi)
- Elevation: 206 m (676 ft)

Population (2001)
  - Total: 23,000
- Time zone: UTC3 (EAT)
- Postal code: 602

Analamisampy is a municipality in Madagascar. It belongs to the district of Toliara II, which is a part of Atsimo-Andrefana Region. The population of the commune was estimated to be approximately 23,000 in 2001 commune census.

It is 107 km north of Toliara (Tuléar) and it regroups 17 fokontany (villages). The principal tribe in the area are the Masikoro.

Primary and junior level secondary education are available in town. The majority 54% of the population of the commune are farmers, while an additional 44% receives their livelihood from raising livestock. The most important crop is maize and rice. Services provide employment for 2% of the population.

== Roads ==
The municipality is crossed by the RN9 from Toliara (Tulear) to Mandabe.
