= Antongo Vaovao =

- Location in Madagascar
- Coordinates: 21°24′S 43°35′E
- Country: Madagascar
- Region: Atsimo-Andrefana
- District: Morombe
- Elevation: 6 m (20 ft)

Population (2001)
  - Total: 7,000
- Time zone: UTC3 (EAT)

Antongo Vaovao is a town and commune in Madagascar. It belongs to the district of Morombe, which is a part of Atsimo-Andrefana Region. The population of the commune was estimated to be approximately 7,000 in 2001 commune census.

Only primary schooling is available. The majority 70% of the population of the commune are farmers, while an additional 10% receives their livelihood from raising livestock. The most important crop is lima beans, while other important products are maize, sweet potatoes and cowpeas. Services provide employment for 5% of the population. Additionally fishing employs 15% of the population.
