= Soaserana, Manja =

Town in Madagascar

Soaserana
- Location in Madagascar
- Coordinates: 21°7′S 44°13′E
- Country: Madagascar
- Region: Menabe
- District: Manja
- Elevation: 144 m (472 ft)

Population (2001)
  - Total: 11,000
- Time zone: UTC3 (EAT)

Soaserana is a town and commune (Malagasy: kaominina) in Madagascar. It belongs to the district of Manja, which is a part of Menabe Region. The population of the commune was estimated to be approximately 11,000 in 2001 commune census.

Only primary schooling is available. The majority 98% of the population of the commune are farmers, while an additional 2% receives their livelihood from raising livestock. The most important crops are rice and onions; also lima beans are an important agricultural product.
