= Ankiliabo, Manja =

Ankiliabo
- Location in Madagascar
- Coordinates: 21°42′S 43°54′E
- Country: Madagascar
- Region: Menabe
- District: Manja
- Elevation: 49 m (161 ft)

Population (2001)
  - Total: 14,000
- Time zone: UTC3 (EAT)
- Postal code: 616

Ankiliabo is a municipality in Madagascar. It belongs to the district of Manja, which is a part of Menabe Region. The population of the commune was estimated to be approximately 14,000 in 2001 commune census.

Primary and junior level secondary education are available in town. The majority 100% of the population of the commune are farmers. The most important crop is lima beans, while other important products are beans and rice.

== Nature ==
The Kirindy Mitea National Park is situated in this municipality together with its neighboring towns of Beharona and Andranopasy.

== Rivers ==
The delta of the Mangoky River and the Sakalava River.

== Ethnics ==
80% of its population belong to the Antaisaka people, the remaining are Sakalava, Betsileo and Merina.
