= Ambahikily =

- Location in Madagascar
- Coordinates: 21°36′S 43°40′E
- Country: Madagascar
- Region: Atsimo-Andrefana
- District: Morombe
- Elevation: 19 m (62 ft)

Population (2018)Census
  - Total: 58,027
- Time zone: UTC3 (EAT)
- Postal code: 618
- Climate: Aw

Ambahikily is a municipality in Madagascar. It belongs to the district of Morombe, which is a part of Atsimo-Andrefana Region. The population of this municipality is 58,027 inhabitants. It is situated on the National road 55 and in the Mangoky River delta.

== Rivers ==
Ambahikily is situated at the Mangoky River.

Ambahikily & the Mangoky River

Primary and junior level secondary education are available in town. The majority 80% of the population of the commune are farmers, while an additional 13% receives their livelihood from raising livestock. The most important crop is rice, while other important products are lima beans and cowpeas. Services provide employment for 2% of the population. Additionally fishing employs 5% of the population.
