= Velondriake =

Coordinates: 22.0667°S 43.2333°E

Velondriake, meaning "to live with the sea" in the Vezo dialect of the Malagasy language, is a locally managed marine area (LMMA). Established in 2006 in southwest Madagascar, Velondriake is home to over 7,000 resident Vezo people and covers a marine and coastal area of about 64,000 ha making it one of the largest LMMAs in the western Indian Ocean. The LMMA includes extensive coral reefs, mangroves, seagrass beds, baobab forests, spiny forest and other threatened habitats. The LMMA includes five permanent coral reef reserves, two permanent mangrove reserves, and numerous periodic fisheries closures (PFCs), primarily for octopus on reefs and for mud crab in mangroves.

Velondriake obtained temporary protected area status in 2010 and received its permanent protection status in 2015. Blue Ventures a UK-based marine conservation NGO that has been working in Velondriake and throughout Madagascar as part of their integrated approach to marine conservation since 2003, is recognised as the area's co-management authority, alongside the community-based Velondriake Association.

Velondriake is divided into three geographical regions, or vondrona, each with an elected cabinet (president, vice president, secretary, treasurer, and advisers). Finally, the three regions are led by a central committee of 21, called the foibe, which also has elected cabinet members.

The LMMA is governed by a set of local laws devised by the communities within Velondriake, called dina. The dina is legally recognized and restricts destructive fishing practices such as poison fishing and beach seining, governs six permanent marine reserves, and oversees temporary closures of octopus fishing grounds and mangrove reserves. An elected body made up of community members, called the Velondriake Association, is responsible for enforcement of the dina.

All permanent residents of villages within Velondriake are "de jure" members, with the right to participate in the association and benefit from its actions. The Velondriake General Assembly consists of elected representatives from each of the 25 villages within the LMMA; larger villages, such as Andavadoaka, have six representatives, while smaller villages have only two or three. Velondriake is divided into three geographical regions, or "vondrona", each with an elected cabinet (president, vice president, secretary, treasurer, and advisers). Finally, the three regions are led by a central committee of about 20, called the "foibe", which also has elected cabinet members.

The Velondriake LMMA and Blue Ventures are supported by several partner organisations, including the University of Toliara, The MacArthur Foundation and MIHARI

Management efforts in the Velondriake LMMA focus on sustainable fisheries management, sea cucumber and seaweed aquaculture, blue carbon initiatives, community health and homestays as part of an integrated approach to marine conservation. Velondriake's success has inspired a wave of similar grassroots projects around Madagascar

[ TOC ]

== Community-led Marine Management ==
The small-scale fishing communities within the Velondriake LMMA have been implementing periodic fishery closures for the reef octopus since 2004. The closures cover 20–25 percent of a community's overall octopus fishing grounds and are usually in place for 2–3 months at various times of year. An analysis of eight years of data found that octopus landings increased by more than 700 percent in the month following the opening of a closure, boosting the catch per fisher per day by almost 90 percent over the same period.

The MIHARI Network was established in 2012 to facilitate networking and learning exchanges between LMMA associations in Madagascar. The Network, of which Velondriake is a founding member, shares best practice in sustainable fishing practices between fishers, LMMA members and NGO partners, and develops management guidelines to safeguard Madagascar's marine resources. The Velondriake LMMA association hosted MIHARI's first LMMA forum in partnership with Blue Ventures in Andavadoaka in 2012.

Velondriake continues to play a key role in sharing best practice in local fisheries management. The Velondriake communities work with Blue Ventures to host Fisheries Learning Exchanges (FLEs). These have been instrumental in driving an unprecedented expansion in local fisheries management and conservation initiatives within Madagascar and beyond. Similar regimes have spread to the United Republic of Tanzania, Mayotte, Mexico, Mauritius, Indonesia and Mozambique. Over the past decade, an estimated 550 fishing community representatives from ten countries have visited Andavadoaka to learn about octopus fishery closures and LMMA establishment, to discuss management issues, and to witness the reopening of a closure.

The Velondriake Locally Managed Marine Area (LMMA) in southwest Madagascar was featured in a film from The Economist, which debuted at the World Ocean Summit.

== Fisheries Improvement Project ==
In January 2019, the octopus fishery management committee (Comité de Gestion de la Pêche aux Poulpes, or CGP) officially launched the Fisheries Improvement Project (FIP) in SW Madagascar. This is the first of its kind in Madagascar and aims to encourage sustainable use of the local octopus population, securing sustained economic benefits for fishers, which in turn promotes further community engagement in fisheries improvement.

There are three distinct phases of the FIP: local marine management on the water; recovery of post harvest losses and community empowerment for equitable benefit sharing. Each successive phase delivers increasing value to fishers and the broader seafood supply chain. Linking fishery products to more rewarding markets ensures that communities are given a fairer price for their catch. This brings more money into the community for much-needed amenities and more income to fishing families, thereby increasing the standard of life. By mobilising local support for fisheries sustainability in this way, FIPs play a powerful role in community empowerment.

== Sea Cucumber and Seaweed Aquaculture ==
Community-managed sea cucumber and seaweed aquaculture farms supplement local incomes and provide alternative livelihoods to fishing, with the aim of reducing fishing pressure and alleviating poverty. In January 2018, after two years upgrading the aquaculture farming and stock security systems, the community of Tampolove in the Bay of Assassins, within the Velondriake LMMA, restarted their farming site. Over 80 farmers are now using their improved farming enclosures.

== Blue Carbon ==
The Blue Ventures Blue Forests team has been working with ten communities surrounding the Bay of Assassins, in the southern part of the Velondriake LMMA since 2013. The team is employing participatory approaches which involve community design and implementation of mangrove management plans that address the problems of degradation and deforestation of mangroves. This is Madagascar's first community-based mangrove carbon project, known in local dialect as the Tahiry Honko Carbon Project. It aims to generate sustainable funding through the sale of carbon credits, to incentivise and fund community-led mangrove conservation initiatives in the Velondriake LMMA and to alleviate poverty in the communities that are highly dependent on mangroves for their livelihood.

The management plan, designed by the local community, includes 257 ha of strict conservation zone, where logging is forbidden. There are 973 ha of mangrove set aside for sustainable harvest and 163 ha of degraded mangrove areas, that are designated for mangrove replanting. The ten villages have agreed to planting ten hectares per year and by April 2019, community groups, including seaweed farmers, youth clubs, school children and women's associations had re-planted 47 ha of degraded mangrove area.

== Community Health Program - Safidy ==
The Safidy community health programme was established by Blue Ventures in 2007, in response to unmet family planning and other health needs expressed by communities in the Velondriake LMMA. The programme's name 'Safidy' means 'choice' in Malagasy, because it enables people to choose the number, timing and spacing of their children. In addition to community-based family planning services, Safidy services also cover maternal and child health, malaria prevention and hygiene promotion initiatives.

Safidy services and education are delivered mainly by local women who have been trained to serve as community health workers. Safe birthing facilities and long-acting contraception are provided through partnerships with the Madagascar Ministry of Public Health and Marie Stopes Madagascar.

Links between Safidy and Blue Ventures help to integrate health and environment topics. Community health workers are invited to present the services they can offer at aquaculture or Velondriake Association meetings.

The work of the Safidy programme in Velondriake has inspired a national Health-Environment (PHE) network in Madagascar. The Velondriake area serves as a learning and demonstration site for other conservation organisations that are interested in promoting health-environment partnerships. Safidy received an Excellence in Leadership for Family Planning (EXCELL) award in 2013.

== Homestays ==
Hébergement Vezo, the homestay association of the remote village of Andavadoaka, officially registered with the Velondriake Association in 2017. Since then more than 150 families have joined this programme, which provides coastal communities with an alternative source of income by offering homestay accommodation to travellers. The programme was originally set up in collaboration with Blue Ventures with the aim of delivering economic benefits through tourism activities directly to communities. The association is currently in the process of being handed over to the Velondriake Association, who will manage it together with other ecotourism initiatives in the region.

== Education ==
Other activities implemented within the LMMA include formal and informal youth environmental education programmes supported by Blue Ventures, the MacArthur Foundation and UNICEF. Youth clubs in the Velondriake area are currently working to provide a platform for youth to share their ideas and take action towards alleviating what they see as major problems facing their community. They share important conservation and health messages with their peers through radio shows and community film screenings.

== Awards ==
- Safidy received an Excellence in Leadership for Family Planning (EXCELL) award in 2013.
- The President of Velondriake was awarded the World Wildlife Fund (WWF) J Paul Getty Award in 2008 for his outstanding leadership and contribution to conservation. The prize money has since been used to establish a scholarship fund for selected students from his home region of southwest Madagascar who wish to study marine conservation.
- Andavadoaka, one of the founding villages of the LMMA, won the United Nations Development Program's (UNDP) Equator Prize in 2007 for success in piloting the first temporary octopus closure, which has since been replicated over 150 times throughout more than 35 villages along Madagascar's coastline.
