= Basibasy mine =

- Location within Madagascar

Location
- Location: Basibasy, Atsimo-Andrefana, Madagascar; 22°9′S 43°36′E

Production
- Products: Titanium

The Basibasy mine is one of the largest titanium mines in Madagascar. The mine is located in Basibasy, Atsimo-Andrefana. The mine has reserves amounting to 446 million tonnes of ore grading 5.5% titanium.
