= Befandefa =

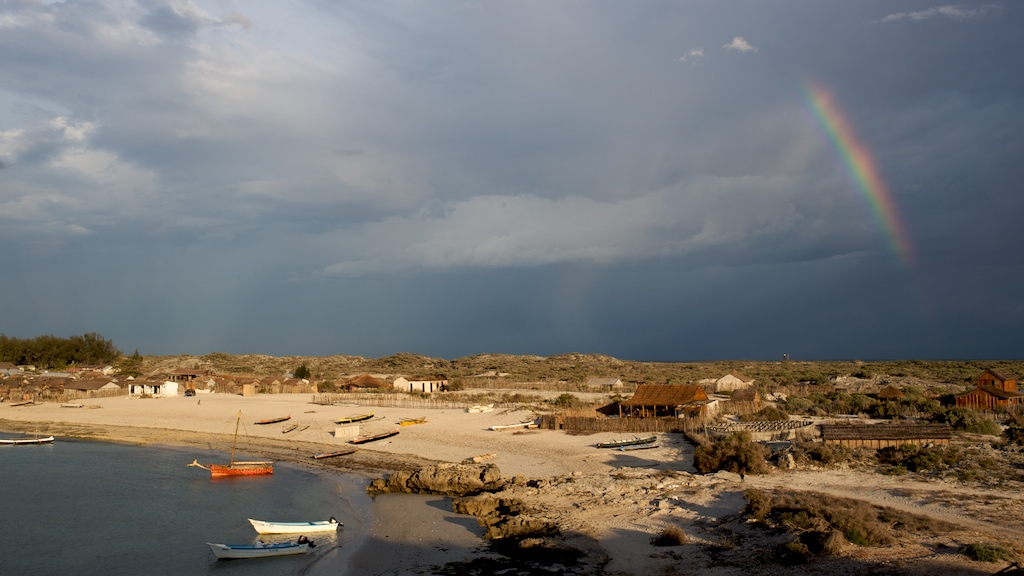
- Andavadoaka, a village of Befandefa

- Location in Madagascar
- Coordinates: 22°8′S 43°18′E
- Country: Madagascar
- Region: Atsimo-Andrefana
- District: Morombe
- Elevation: 7 m (23 ft)

Population (2018)census
  - Total: 11,812
- Time zone: UTC3 (EAT)
- Postal code: 618

Befandefa is a rural municipality in Madagascar. It belongs to the district of Morombe, which is a part of Atsimo-Andrefana Region. The population of the municipality had been 11,812 inhabitants in 2018.

Primary and secondary schools are available in the direct presence of Befandefa. The majority 70% of the population works in fishing. 15% are farmers, while an additional 2% receives their livelihood from raising livestock. The most important crop is maize, while other important products are cassava and sweet potatoes. Industry and services provide employment for 1% and 12% of the population, respectively.

Befandefa has access to an electricity grid, fed by about 15 kWp of PV panels.

== See also ==
- Andavadoaka
