= Manja District =

Manja
- District
- Location in Madagascar
- Coordinates: 21°26′S 44°20′E
- Country: Madagascar
- Region: Menabe
- District: Manja

Area
  - Total: 9,073 km^{2} (3,503 sq mi)
- Elevation: 0–350 m (0–1,148 ft)

Population (2020)
  - Total: 111,430
  - Density: 12.28/km^{2} (31.81/sq mi)
- Time zone: UTC3 (EAT)
- Postal code: 616

Manja is a district of Menabe in Madagascar approximately 70 km in the south of the capitol Morondava. The district has an area of 9,073 km^{2} (3,503 sq mi), and the estimated population in 2020 was 111,430.

== Municipalities ==
The district is further divided into six communes:

- Andranopasy
- Ankiliabo
- Anontsibe Centre
- Beharona
- Manja
- Soaserana

== Rivers ==
The Mangoky River in the south and the Sakalava River.

== Protected areas ==
- Part of the Mangoky-Ihotry wetland complex, a protected harmonious landscape
- Part of Kirindy Mitea National Park
