= Andavadoaka Airport =

Airport in Madagascar

- IATA: DVD; ICAO: none

Summary
- Airport type: Public
- Serves: Andavadoaka, Madagascar
- Coordinates: 22°06′S 043°16′E

Map
- Location of airport in Madagascar

Andavadoaka Airport (IATA: DVD) is an airport in Andavadoaka, a town in the Toliara Province of the Atsimo-Andrefana region of Madagascar. It is located on the west coast of the island, south-west of the capital Antananarivo.
