= Tanandava Station =

Tanandava Station Ankatsakatsa Sud
- Nickname: Nosy Ambositra
- Location in Madagascar
- Coordinates: 21°55′S 43°58′E
- Country: Madagascar
- Region: Atsimo-Andrefana
- District: Morombe
- Established: 26.February 2015
- Elevation: 65 m (213 ft)

Population (2018)Census
  - Total: 18,235
- Time zone: UTC3 (EAT)
- Postal code: 618

Tanandava Station (Nosy Ambositra, also known as: Ankatsakatsa Sud) is a rural municipality in Madagascar. It belongs to the district of Morombe, which is a part of Atsimo-Andrefana Region. It has a population of 18,235.

The municipality was renamed in 2015. The former name was Nosy Ambositra and the main town is Ankatsakatsa Sud. It is situated at the Mangoky River.

Tanandava Station is served by a local airport. Only primary schooling is available. The majority (90%) of the population of the commune are farmers, while an additional 5% receive their livelihood from raising livestock. The most important crop is lima beans, while other important products include cassava, sweet potatoes and rice. Services provide employment for 1% of the population. Additionally fishing employs 4% of the population.
