= Manja, Madagascar =

Manja
- Location in Madagascar
- Coordinates: 21°26′S 44°20′E
- Country: Madagascar
- Region: Menabe
- District: Manja

Area
  - Total: 9,251 km^{2} (3,572 sq mi)
- Elevation: 253 m (830 ft)

Population (2001)
  - Total: 9,000
- Time zone: UTC3 (EAT)
- Postal code: 616

Manja is a town and commune (Malagasy: kaominina) in Madagascar. It belongs to the district of Manja, which is a part of Menabe Region. The population of the commune was estimated to be approximately 30,000 as of 2015 commune census.

Manja is served by a local Manja Airport. In addition to primary schooling the town offers secondary education at both junior and senior levels. The town provides access to hospital services to its citizens. It is also a site of industrial-scale mining.

The majority 80% of the population of the commune are farmers, while an additional 17% receives their livelihood from raising livestock. The most important crop is rice, while other important products are beans, cassava and onions. Industry and services provide employment for 0.5% and 2.5% of the population, respectively.

== Roads ==
The commune is crossed by the RN9 from Toliara (Tulear) to Mandabe.
