= Mandja =

Mandja may refer to:

- Mandja language
- Mandja people

== See also ==
- Manja (disambiguation)
