= Manja Airport =

Airport in Madagascar

- IATA: MJA; ICAO: FMSJ

Summary
- Serves: Manja
- Location: Manja, Madagascar
- Elevation AMSL: 787 ft / 240 m
- Coordinates: 21°25′0″S 44°19′0″E

Map
- Location of Airport in Madagascar

Runways
Direction	Length		Surface
Direction	ft	m	Surface
	5,249	1,600

Manja Airport is an airport in Manja, Menabe Region, Madagascar (IATA: MJA, ICAO: FMSJ).
