= Basibasy =

- Location in Madagascar
- Coordinates: 22°10′S 43°39′E
- Country: Madagascar
- Region: Atsimo-Andrefana
- District: Morombe
- Elevation: 88 m (289 ft)

Population (2001)
  - Total: 12,000
- Time zone: UTC3 (EAT)
- Postal code: 618

Basibasy is a municipality in Madagascar. It belongs to the district of Morombe, which is a part of Atsimo-Andrefana Region. The population of the commune was estimated to be approximately 12,000 in 2001 commune census.

To Basibasy belong also the fokontany (villages) of Basibasy, Ambariaho, Behibake, Antalivy, Bevondro, Ankilambahia, Aminaomby and Taimbalabo.

Only primary schooling is available. The majority 55% of the population of the commune are farmers, while an additional 43% receives their livelihood from raising livestock. The most important crop is rice, while other important products are maize and cassava. Services provide employment for 2% of the population.

== See also ==
- Basibasy mine
