= Route nationale 55 (Madagascar) =

Road in Madagascar

Location
- Country: Madagascar

Highway system
- Roads in Madagascar

Route nationale 55 (RN 55) is a secondary highway in Madagascar, running from the intersection of RN 9 to Morombe. It crosses the region of Atsimo-Andrefana.

== Selected locations on route ==
- intersection with RN 9
- Ambahikily
- Morombe

== See also ==
- List of roads in Madagascar
- Transport in Madagascar
