= Barren Isles =

Archipelago of Madagascar

Designations

Ramsar Wetland
- Official name: Iles Barren
- Designated: 22 May 2017
- Reference no.: 2303

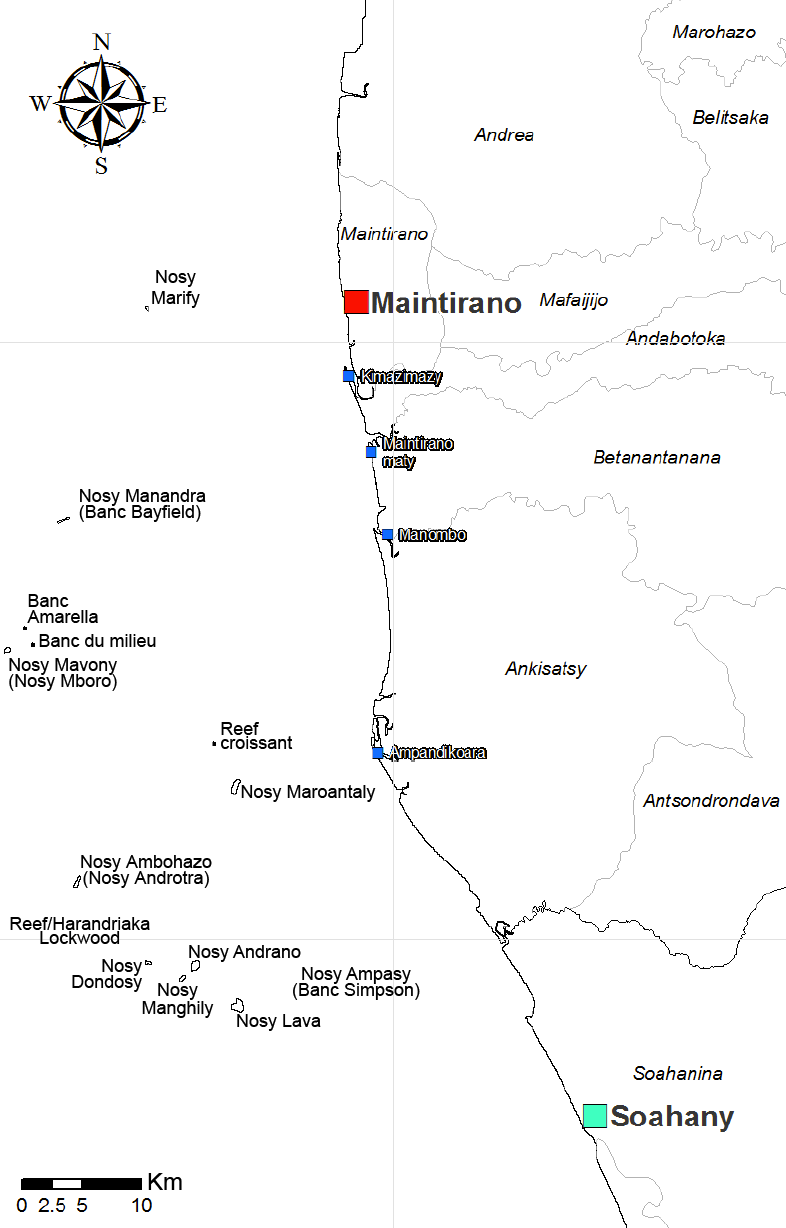
Map of the Barren Isles archipelago

The Barren Isles (Nosy Barren in Malagasy) are an archipelago located in an area spanning 40 kilometres (25 miles) off the west coast of Madagascar, in the Melaky region. The archipelago consists of 9 main isles or sand banks.

== Population ==
Until November 2013, local customs forbade living on the archipelago; only local fishermen were allowed to shelter or rest for a few days. Since 2004, Vezo fishermen from south of Toliara in the southwest of Madagascar have migrated to the archipelago in increased numbers. Many now stay on the isles between March and December for up to 10 months of the year, living in makeshift houses made of palms, tarpaulins and pieces of wood. The diverse-eco system now provides shelter for around 4,000 Vezo fishermen

== Geography ==
The Barren Isles consist of the following 9 main isles:

- Nosy Marify
- Nosy Manandra (variously Banc Bayfield)
- Nosy Mboro (variously Nosy Mavony)
- Nosy Maroantaly
- Nosy Abohazo (variously Nosy Androtra)
- Nosy Dondosy
- Nosy Mangily
- Nosy Andrano
- Nosy Lava

== History ==
The Barren Isles archipelago was classified as a potential marine-protected area zone by the National Service of Protected Areas (Système des Aires Protégées de Madagascar or SAPM) related to the Ministry of Environment and Forests.
