= Andavadoaka =

- Location in Madagascar
- Coordinates: 22°04′S 43°14′E
- Country: Madagascar
- Region: Atsimo-Andrefana
- District: Morombe
- Elevation: 7 m (23 ft)

Population (2018)Census
  - Ethnicities: Vezo
- Time zone: UTC3 (EAT)
- Postal code: 618

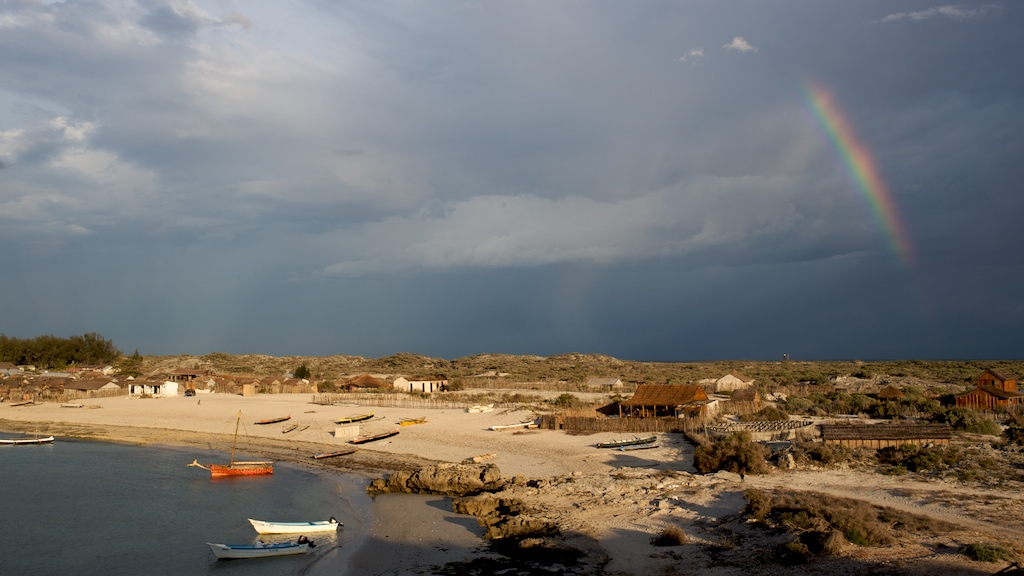
The beach of Andavadoaka

Andavadoaka is a small fishing village located on the southwest coast of Madagascar. It is located in the Morombe (district), 45 km south of the town of Morombe in the region of Atsimo-Andrefana. It belongs to the rural municipality of Befandefa.

The village lies on the edge of a shallow lagoon protected from the open ocean by a series of fringing and submerged barrier reefs that support substantial coral growth, providing a vital resource base for a local artisanal fishery. Owing to the remoteness and isolation, these coral reefs are thought to possess a significantly higher abundance and diversity of species than other reefs in southwest Madagascar.

Andavadoaka is one of the founding villages of a locally managed marine area. The village won the Equator Prize, awarded by the United Nations Development Program (UNDP), in 2007.

Near Andavodoaka, Biodiversity studies have identified many hundreds of marine species in the waters in the area. The reefs around Andavadoaka represent some of the most well-developed coral reef systems in the Indian Ocean.

== Population and Ethnicity ==
- Demographics: According to the 2005 census, Andavadoaka had 1,200 inhabitants across 174 households, with 52% of the population being women.
- Ethnicity: Andavadoaka is inhabited by the Vezo fishing people. The population mainly consists of Vezo people, semi-nomadic marine fishers who have inhabited the southwest coast of Madagascar for generations. The Vezo depend heavily on the sea for food and transport.

== Electricity ==
Andavadoaka is one of the few small villages in the South-West of Madagascar with general access to electricity. It is fed by about 65 kWp of solar panels and backed by a battery bank.

An airport serves the village.
