= Songhor Lagoon =

Wetland site in Ghana

- Songor Ramsar Site
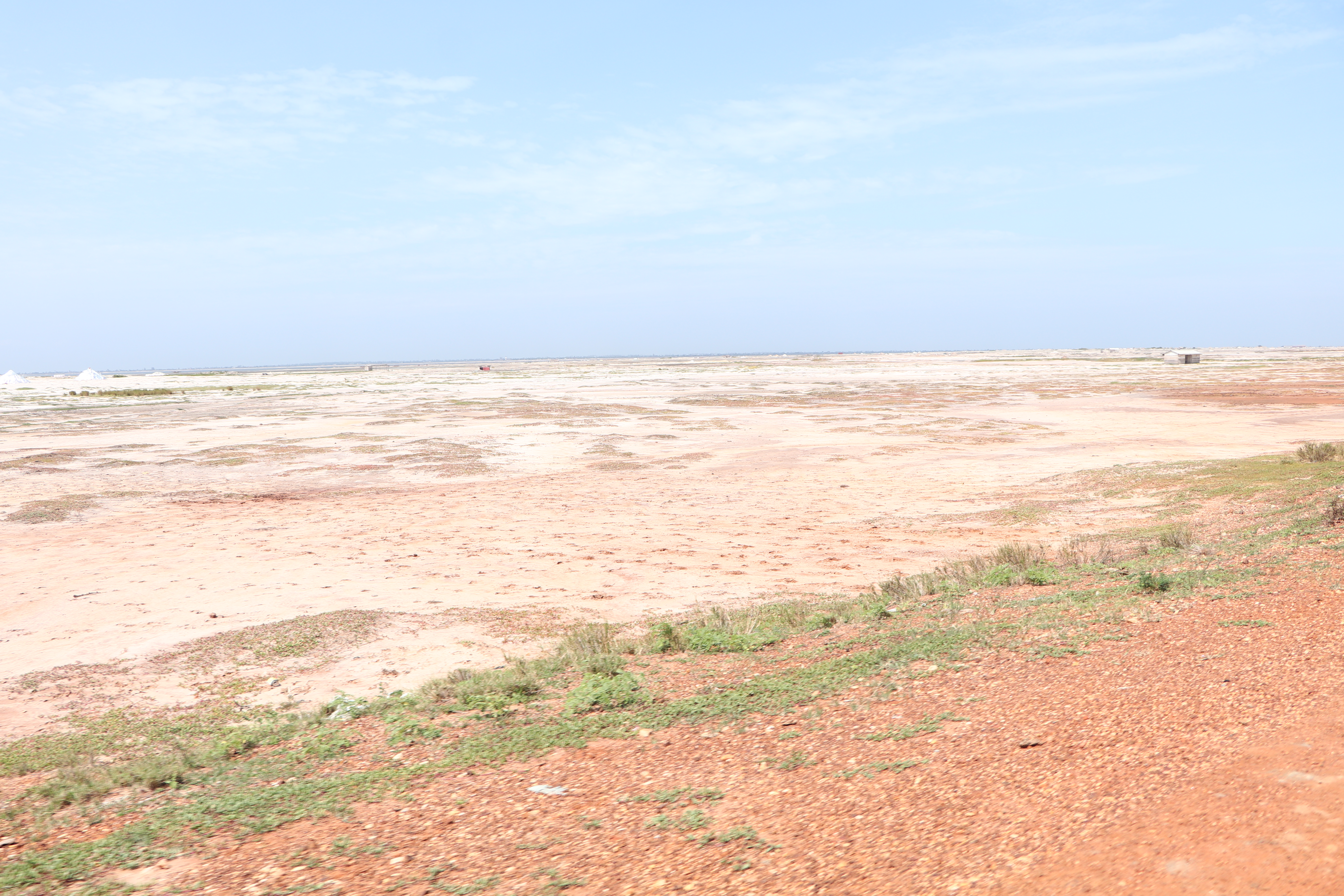
- Songhor Lagoon

- Location within Ghana
- Location: Greater Accra Region
- Nearest city: Ada
- Coordinates: 5°49′40″N 0°27′45″E

Ramsar Wetland
- Official name: Songor Ramsar Site
- Designated: 14 August 1992
- Reference no.: 566

The Songhor Lagoon is a coastal lagoon on the eastern coast of Ghana, West Africa. The site covers an area of 28,740 hectares, and it is located just outside the major town of Ada and to the west of the Volta River estuary. It was designated as Ramsar wetland site of international importance number 566 on June 22, 1988. In 2011, UNESCO approved the Songor Biosphere Reserve as part of the World Network of Biosphere Reserves. Among several other important functions, it acts as habitat and/or breeding ground for several notable species.

== Physical features ==
The site itself is a closed lagoon that is continually refilled by seepage, runoff, creeks, and streams. It is characterized by high salinity levels and surrounded by mudflats that are inundated for most of the year. The soil is a tropical gray earth type with an unconsolidated sand, clay, and gravel composition. Up to a depth of 80 cm, visibility allows for a clear view of the bottom of the lagoon. High tide occurs at a depth of 1.98 m; at this point, water from auxiliary creeks can flow into the lagoon. Low tide occurs at 0.11 m. Average temperature, rainfall, and humidity are 23-33 °C, 750 mm, and 60% respectively. The elevation varies between 15 m near the coast and up to 75 m above sea level.

== Flora ==
Although Sesuvium and mangrove species dominate the area, the florae are largely segregated within the site. The lagoon and mudflats are populated by Paspalum vaginatum, Cyperus articulatus, Sesuvium portulacastrum, and Elocharis mutate. Adropogon guyanus, Heteropogon contortus, and Azadirachta indica are common around the catchment areas while Rhizophora racemosa and Avicennia africana are found along the creeks. The last two mangrove species are considered to be of particular value. While Rhizophora racemosa is not considered threatened by the IUCN Red List of Threatened Species and Avicennia africana has not been evaluated, populations are believed to be in decline. Locals have implemented mangrove restoration projects in the past because they acknowledged that mangroves contribute to the abundance of fauna by providing shelter; the efforts met with varying degrees of success.

== Fauna ==
Several endangered and noteworthy animal species inhabit the Songhor Lagoon. In fact, some intensive research is focused on the sea turtles that nest in the area. The three species that frequent the beaches are: Dermochelys coriacea, Chelonia mydas, and Lepidochelys olivacea. All three species are classified as threatened by the IUCN Red List of Threatened Species. Of marine species, manatees are also known to inhabit the waters surrounding the site. The lagoon additionally acts as an important waypoint for European migratory birds that winter in Ghana. The most commonly seen genera/families are Recurvirostra, Sternidae, and Tringa. Because the site has been known to exceed a bird population of 100,000 in the European winter, with migratory terns, sandpipers, stilts, plovers, and other waterfowl adding to the local population, the Songhor Lagoon is regarded as one of Ghana's most important wetland sites (second only to Keta Lagoon.

== People ==
The Songhor Lagoon is of particular cultural and utilitarian value to the local people living in and around Ada. Reeds, fuel wood, tilapia, crab, and other game are harvested from the site on a mainly subsistence basis while salt is extracted for widespread distribution to Togo, Burkina Faso, Mali, and Nigeria. Several clans in the area, the Adabiawe, Lomobiawe, Dangbebiawe and Tekperbiawe clans, depend on salt extraction as their primary source of revenue, producing approximately 900,000 metric tons of salt per year. In addition to harvesting the natural products of the lagoon, the local people use the land around the lagoon for cattle grazing, road development, and farming cassava, maize, tomatoes, okra, pepper, beans, onions and watermelons. The lagoon is also viewed as a sacred cultural site for some. A small section of the site, called the Yomo lagoon, has been spared from land cultivation for the salt mines. This decision was made in deference to a sect of local people who consider the Yomo lagoon to be a consecrated area. Additionally, several community leaders of Ada have indicated that the natural habitat surrounding the town has been traditionally protected for generations. Aside from granting the lagoon and Volta estuary recognition as some of the few places left on earth where sea turtles still nest, the people of Ada believe that these sites are powerful places where human, animal, and other spirits meet.

== Ecotourism ==
Songhor Lagoon's complement of rare and diverse species makes it a popular tourist attraction. Birders are probably the lagoon's most avid ecotourists, attracted to the thousands of birds that migrate to the site in the European winter. The area's two bird watching platforms, one in Pute and one in Lolanya, host the birders while they observe and photograph varieties such as sandwich, black, royal, roseate, and little terns, black-winged stilts, ringed plovers, curlew sandpipers, spotted redshanks, and greenshanks. The lagoon's second most popular ecotourist attraction is its guided sea turtle walk program. The walks are managed by the Ghana Wildlife Division, with the best months to see turtles being August through March. The walks are conducted at night, between 23:00 and 2:00, when sea turtles are likely to be seen nesting on the beach. However, as all sea turtle species are threatened, the Wildlife Division officers often remind tourists that a turtle sighting is a rare event and cannot be guaranteed to occur during the walk. Other visitors prefer to tour the site by boat, readily booking trips privately or through the Manet Paradise Hotel. These excursions often afford birders a more diverse viewing at Crocodile Island, where little egrets, western reef herons, and cormorants are known to breed; the island is also acclaimed for its basket-weaving industry. Another attraction that can only be reached by boat is Sugar Cane Island, which offers tours of its rum distillery. Additionally, boats can be commissioned through the Manet paradise hotel for deep-sea fishing trips, which generally last all day.

== Threats and possible consequences ==
The main threats to the site exist as varied forms of excessive utilization. Some common cases are over-fishing, extreme harvesting of mangroves, extensive drainage and cultivation for farmland, heavy grazing by cattle and livestock, and an unsustainable level of salt winning. These threats are difficult to neutralize because the human communities surrounding the lagoon are largely poor and over-populated. In effect, the local people are dependent upon their harvesting of the lagoon for survival. Although ecotourism provides an ecologically friendly source of income, the practice is not extensive enough to sustain the local communities. Additional threats originate from the use of pesticides and herbicides, the damming of creeks and channels for the purpose of expanding infrastructure, and rubbish dumping. These threats can and, in some instances, have had dire consequences. The breeding cycles of nesting species, like the several sea turtle species hosted by the lagoon, can be disturbed by exaggerated human activity. Furthermore, the eggs of such species are often trampled by grazing cattle and livestock. Another realized effect of human exploitation is the apparent shrinking of the lagoon, which can be easily observed in the satellite photo comparison shown at the opening of this article. Further disturbance of the lagoon could result in not only the loss of species that inhabit the site, but also the loss of nutritive and moderating benefits provided by the site. Aside from purifying ground water, acting as a reservoir for nutrients, and supporting the local food chain, the lagoon regulates water flow, staggers and lessens the effects of flooding, and disperses the extreme erosive forces exerted on the shore by the Atlantic Ocean.

=== Climate change ===
In 2022, the IPCC Sixth Assessment Report included Songhor Lagoon in the list of African natural heritage sites which would be threatened by flooding and coastal erosion by the end of the century, but only if climate change followed RCP 8.5, which is the scenario of high and continually increasing greenhouse gas emissions associated with the warming of over 4 °C., and is no longer considered very likely. The other, more plausible scenarios result in lower warming levels and consequently lower sea level rise: yet, sea levels would continue to increase for about 10,000 years under all of them. Even if the warming is limited to 1.5 °C, global sea level rise is still expected to exceed 2–3 m (7–10 ft) after 2000 years (and higher warming levels will see larger increases by then), consequently exceeding 2100 levels of sea level rise under RCP 8.5 (~0.75 m (2 ft) with a range of 0.5–1 m (2–3 ft)) well before the year 4000.

== Gallery ==
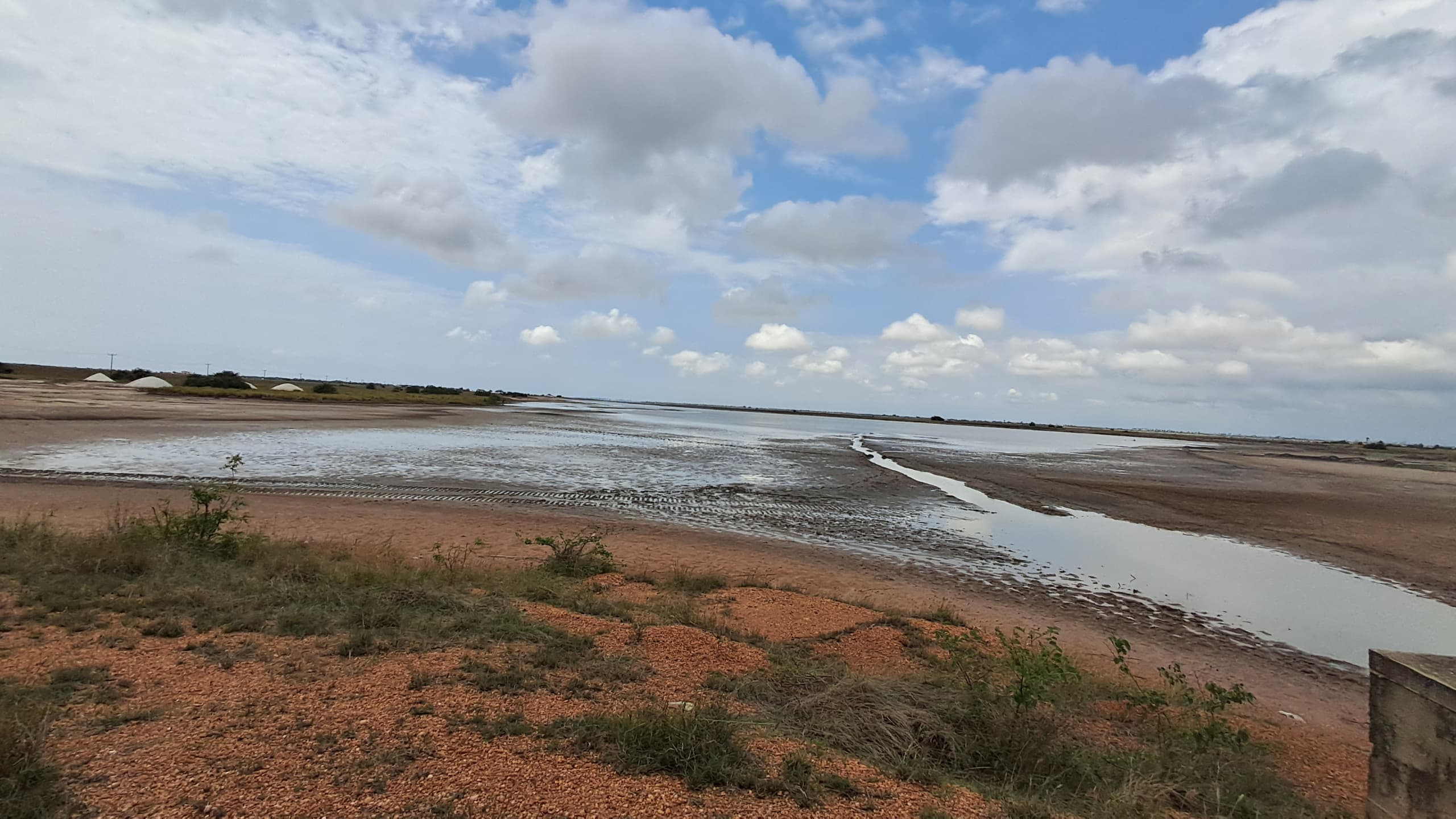

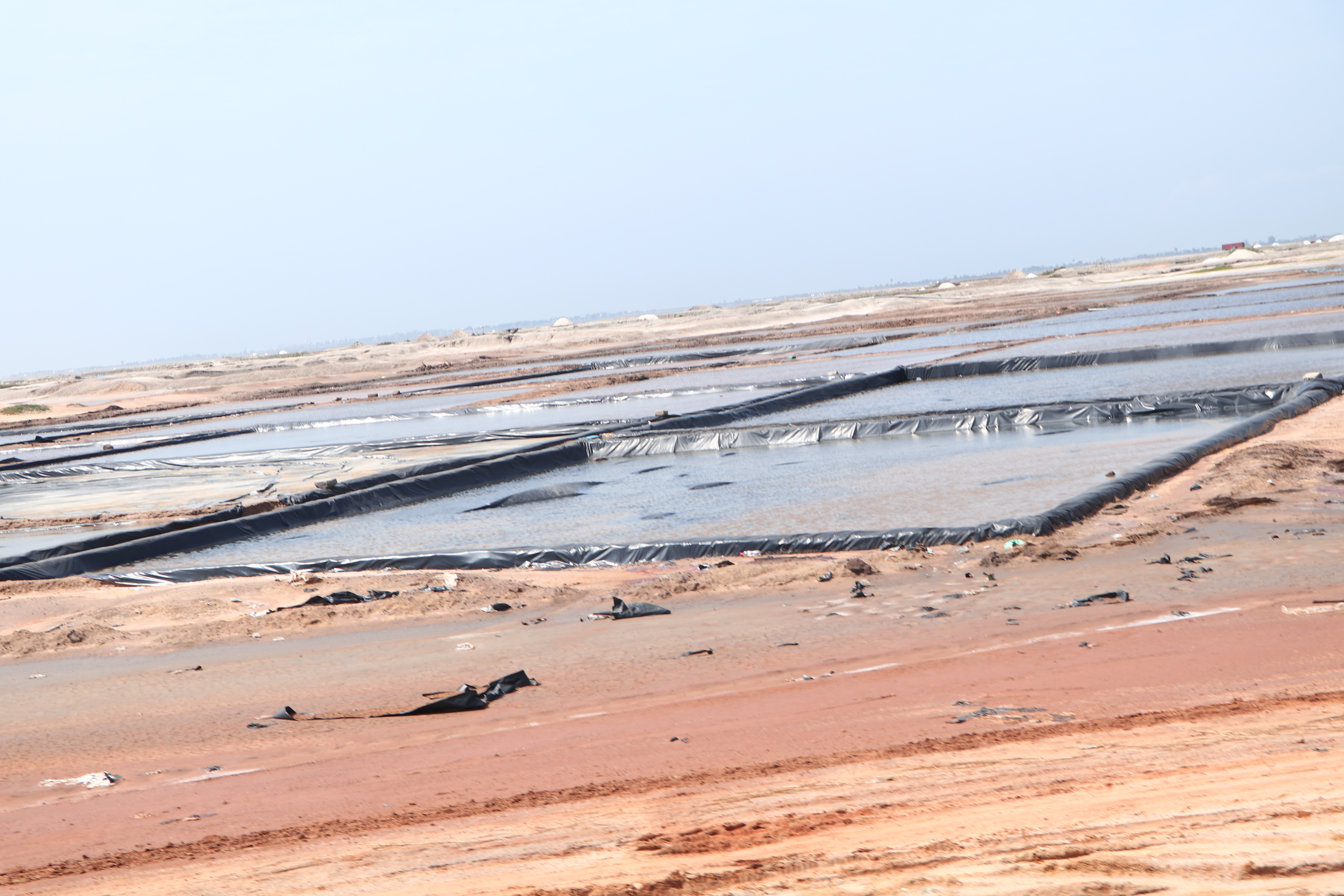

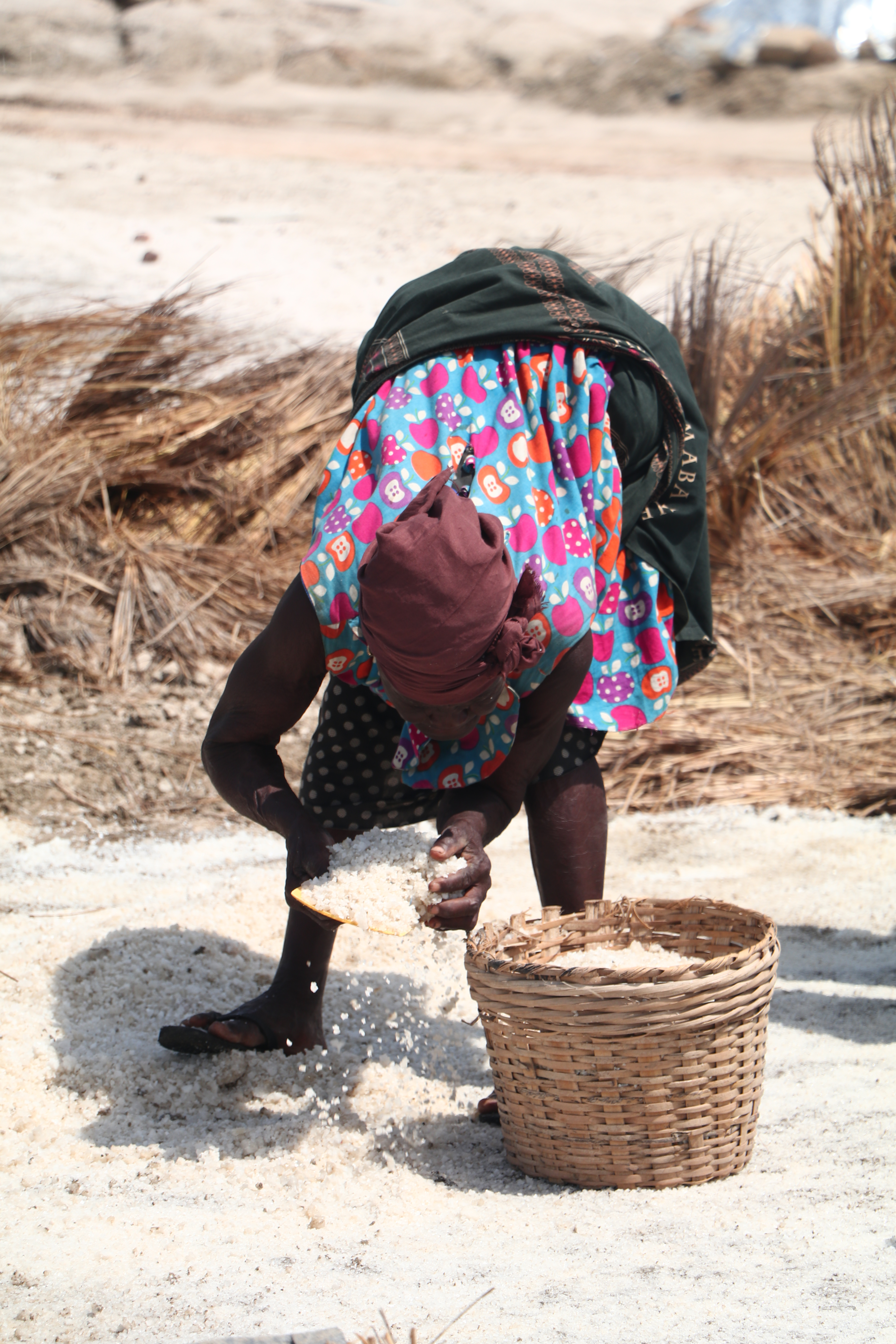
Salt gathering at the Songhor Lagoon

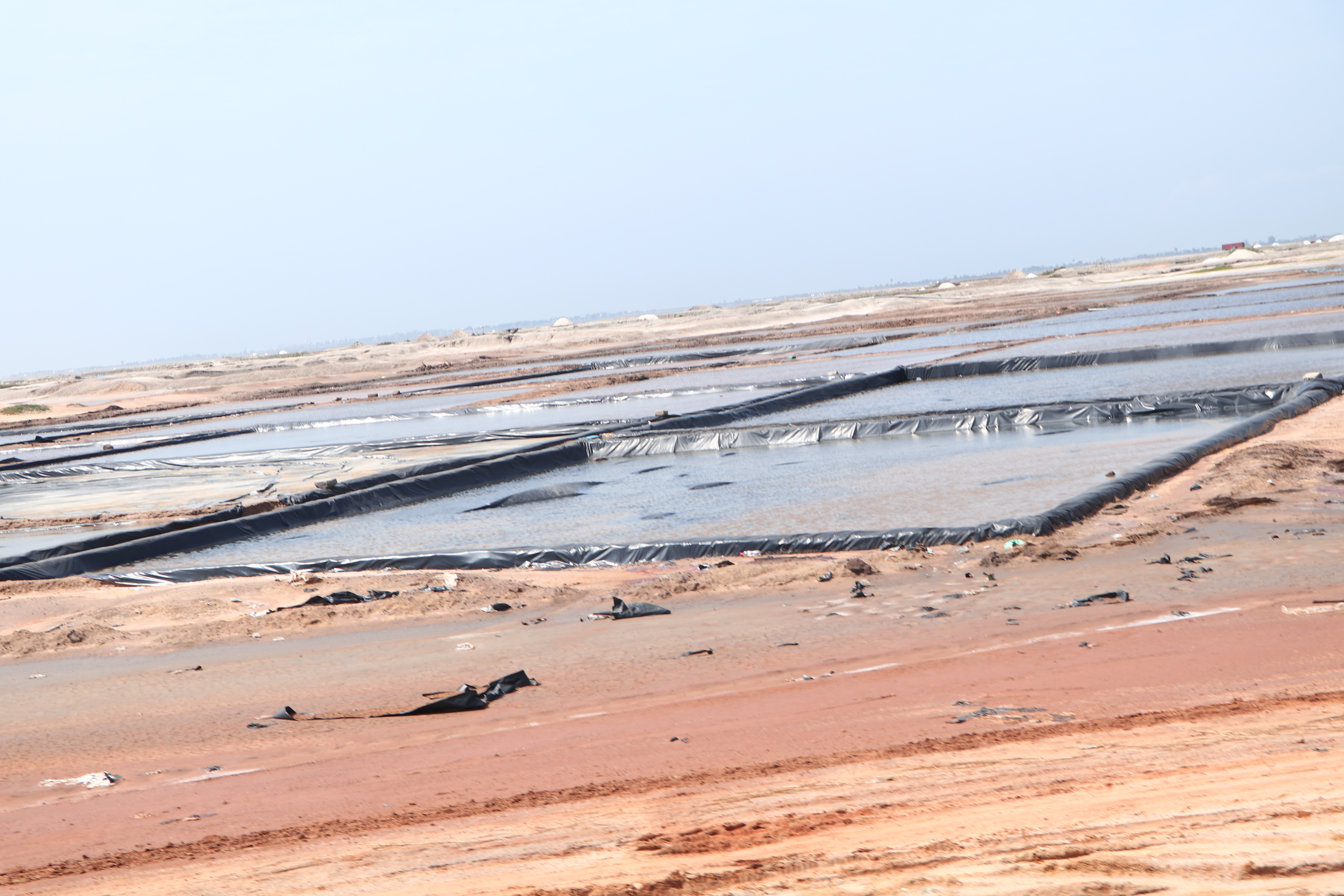

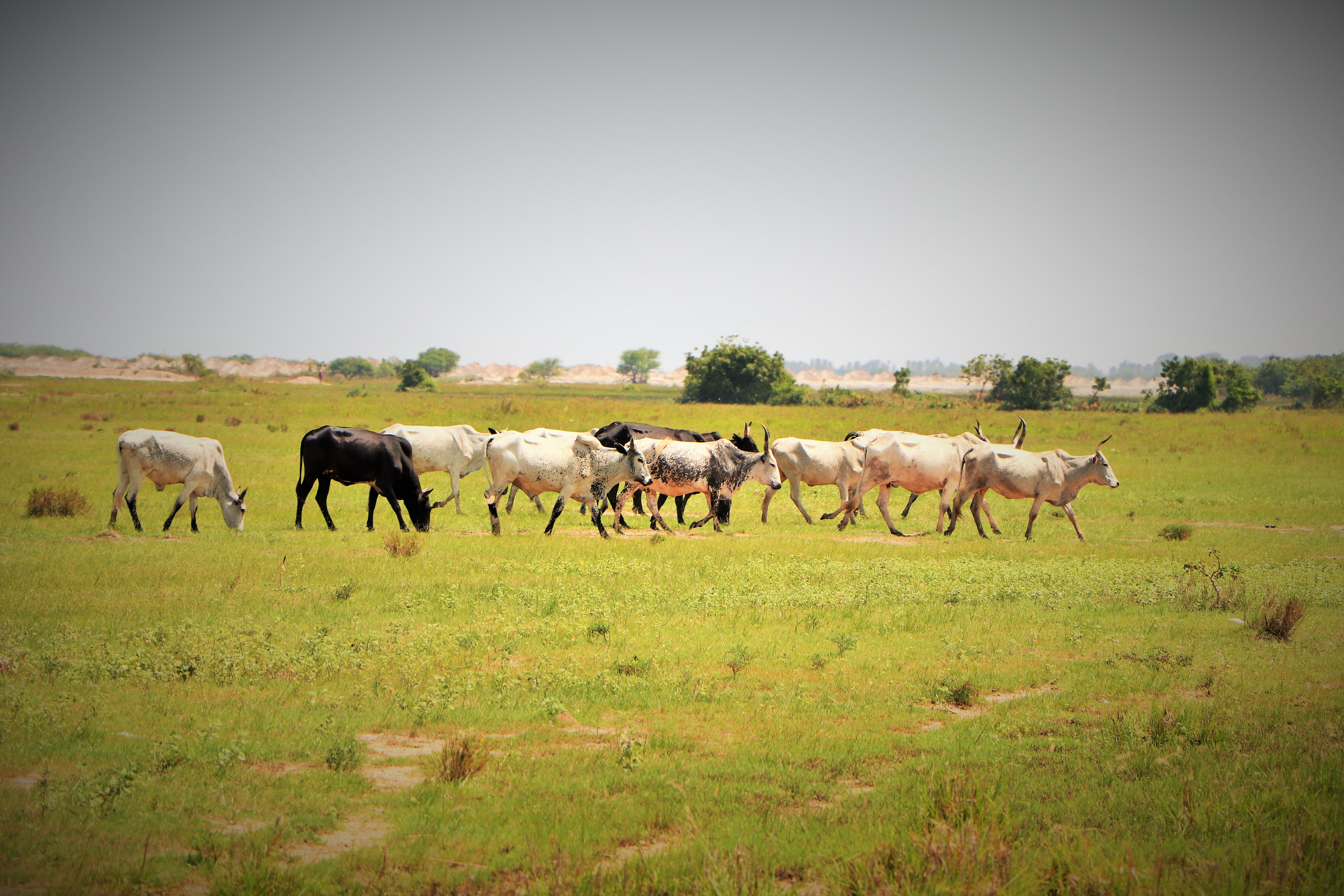

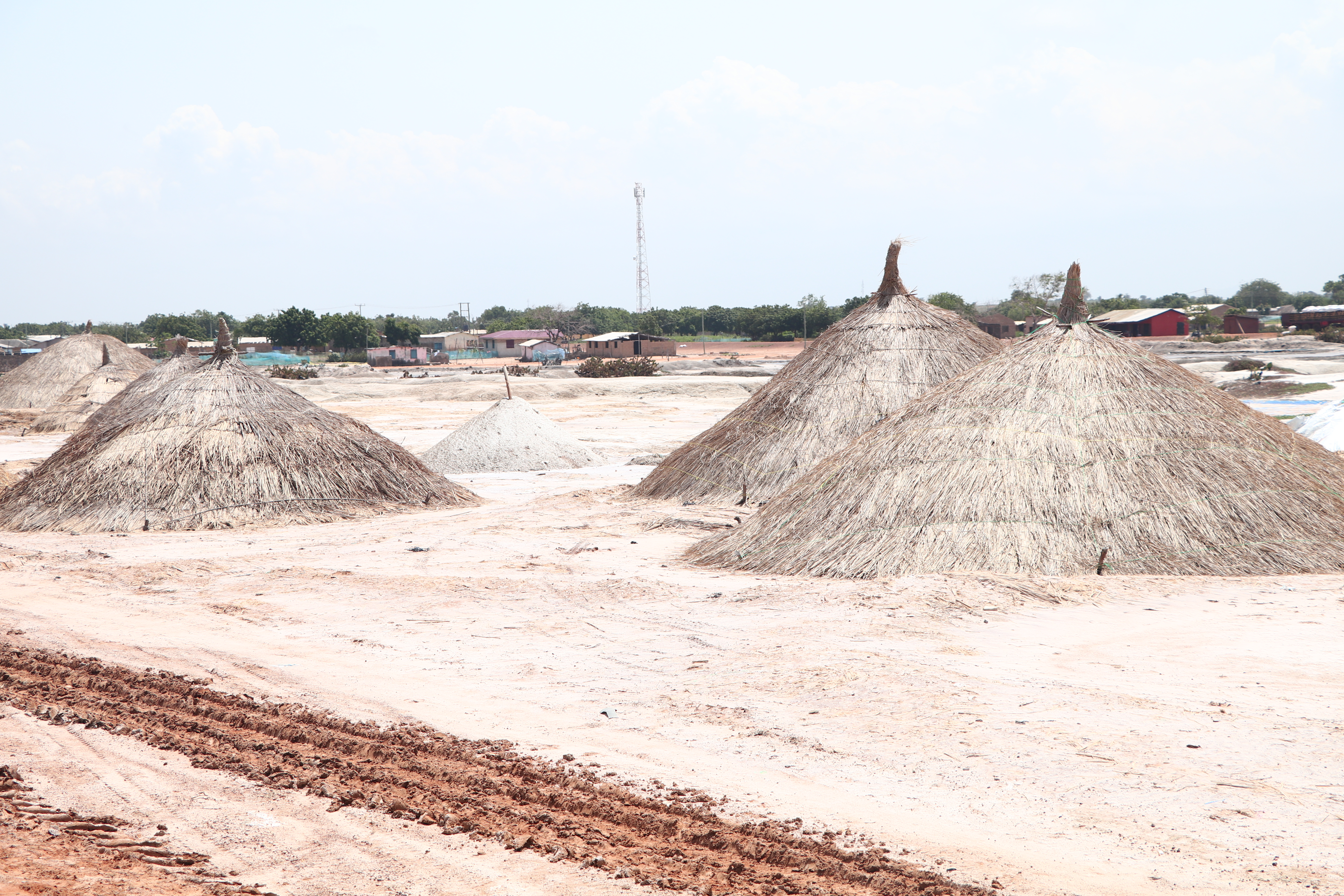

== See also ==
- Keta Lagoon
