= Ambalahonko =

- Location in Madagascar
- Coordinates: 13°35′S 48°25′E
- Country: Madagascar
- Region: Diana
- District: Ambanja
- Elevation: 11 m (36 ft)

Population (2001)
  - Total: 6,000
- Time zone: UTC3 (EAT)

Ambalahonko is a municipality (French: commune, Malagasy: kaominina) in Madagascar. It belongs to the district of Ambanja, which is a part of Diana Region. According to 2001 census the population of Ambalahonko was 6,000.

Only primary schooling is available in town. The majority 98% of the population are farmers. The most important crops are coffee and oranges, while other important agricultural products are cocoa and vanilla. Services provide employment for 0.5% of the population, while fishing employs 1.5% of the population.
