= Kirindy Mitea National Park =

National park in Madagascar

- IUCN category IV (habitat/species management area)
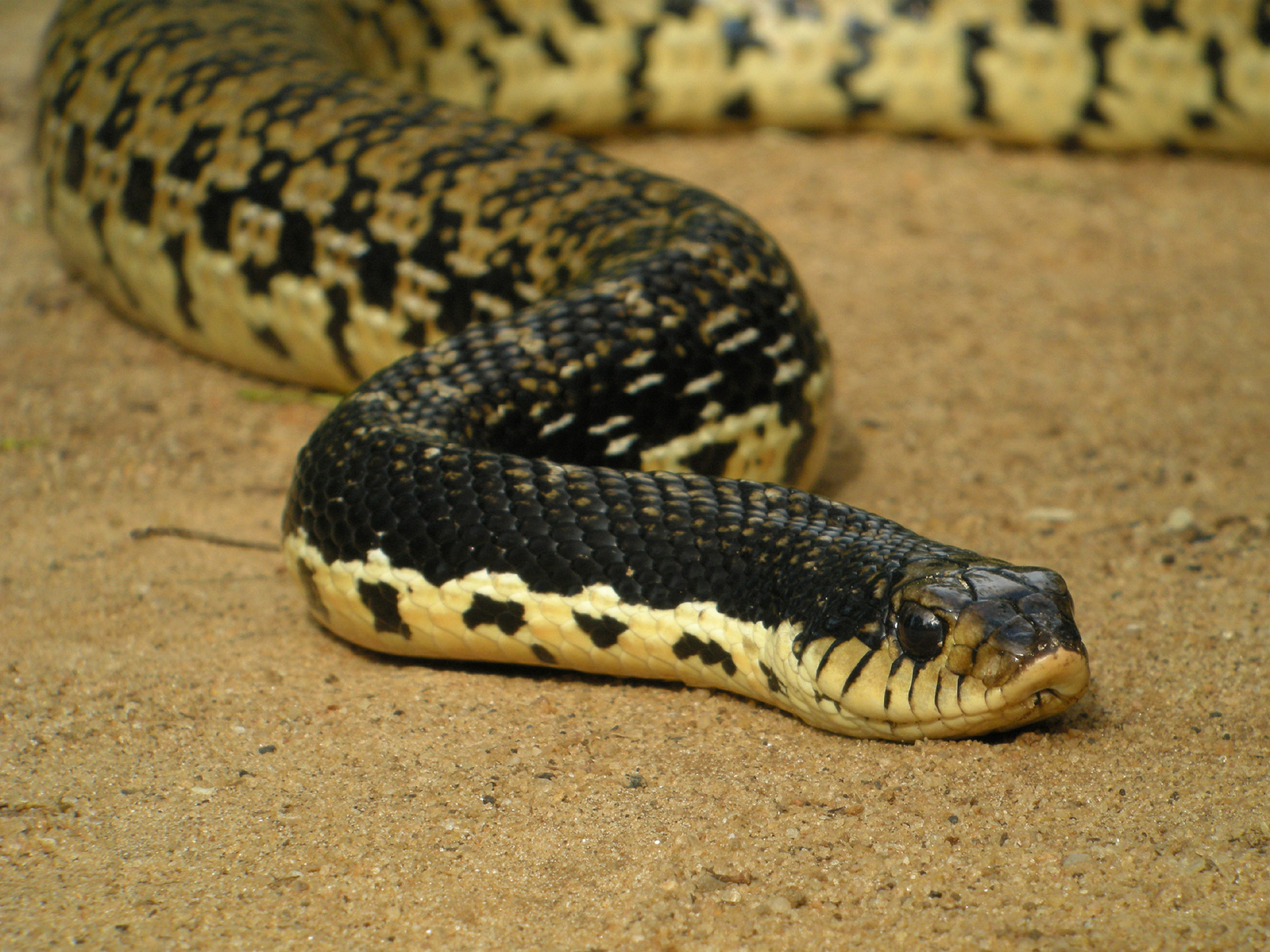
- Malagasy giant hognose snake

- Location within Madagascar
- Nearest city: Belo sur Mer, Morondava
- Coordinates: 20°49′S 44°09′E
- Area: 1,563.5 km^{2} (603.7 sq mi)
- Established: 18 December 1997
- Governing body: Madagascar National Parks Association
- Website: www.parcs-madagascar.com/parcs/kirindy-mite.php

The Kirindy Mitea National Park is a national park on the coast of the Mozambique Channel, in south-west Madagascar. The 72,200 hectares (178,000 acres) park contains many endemic animals and plants and claims to have the greatest density of primates in the world.

== Geography ==
The national park is situated on the south-west coast of the Mozambique Channel and includes a marine area with seven small islands. It is situated in the Menabe Region south of Morondava on the territory of the municipalities of Akiliabo, Beharona and Andranopasy. It is surrounded by the Maharivo River and Lampaolo River. The entrance to the park is 70 kilometres (43 mi) south of Morondava

During the warm, dry season from March to November, much of the wildlife is hibernating, the vegetation is brown and the trees are leafless. Animals and plants come to life in the rainy season when temperature can reach 40 °C (104 °F)

The dominant ethnic group in the area are the Sakalava people.

== Access ==
- by speedboat from Morondava (2h - 60 km) or Belo sur Mer.
- by the Provincial road RIP 110 from Bemanonga and Belo sur Mer (accessible only from May to November)

== Flora and fauna ==
There are a wide range of ecosystems due to reserve being in an area where southern and western biotypes meet. Within the park is the largest remaining area of dry deciduous forest, tropical dry forest, spiny forest, beaches and sand-dunes, mangroves and coral reefs. One hundred and eighty-five species of plants have, so far, been recorded, among them three species of baobab, as well as seven species of mangrove trees.

In this park are found eleven species of mammals of which ten are endemic. Among them are the Madame Berthe's mouse lemur (Microcebus berthae), the smallest primate in the world, which is only known from this park. Also the fossa (Cryptoprocta ferox), Madagascar's largest living predator, and the lemurs only predator (apart from people). Other mammals endemic to the Menabe region include the giant jumping rat (Hypogeomys antimena) and the narrow-striped mongoose (Mungotictis decemlineata). There are also forty-seven species of birds (thirty-three endemic) and twenty-three species of reptiles.

Kirindy supports eight species of lemur:

- Madame Berthe’s mouse lemur – Microcebus berthae
- Red-fronted brown lemur – Eulemur rufifrons
- Pale fork-marked lemur – Phaner pallescens
- Grey mouse lemur – Microcebus murinus
- Coquerel's dwarf lemur – Mirza coquereli
- Fat-tailed dwarf lemur – Cheirogaleus medius
- Red-tailed sportive lemur – Lepilemur ruficaudatus
- Verreaux's sifaka – Propithecus verreauxi

== Gallery ==
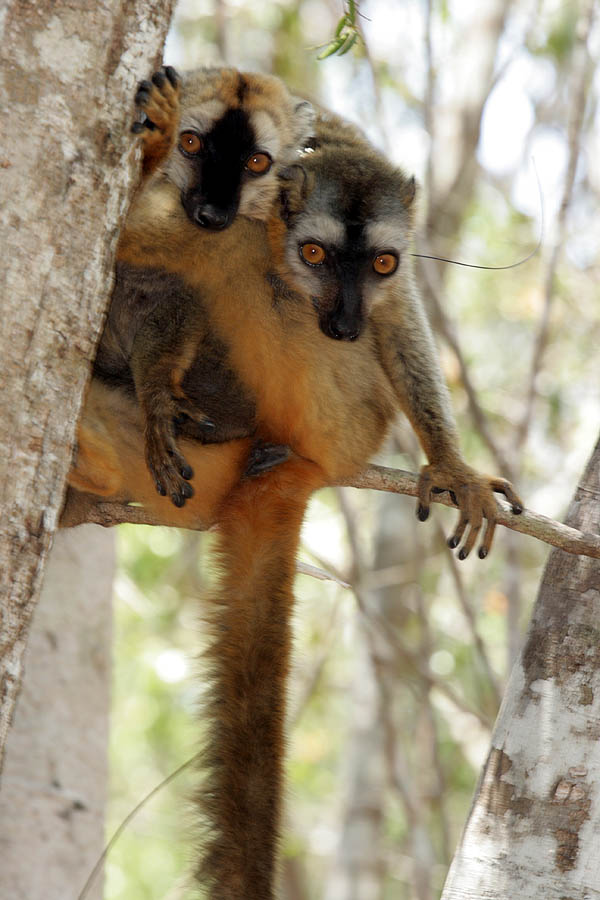
Red-fronted lemur at Kirindy

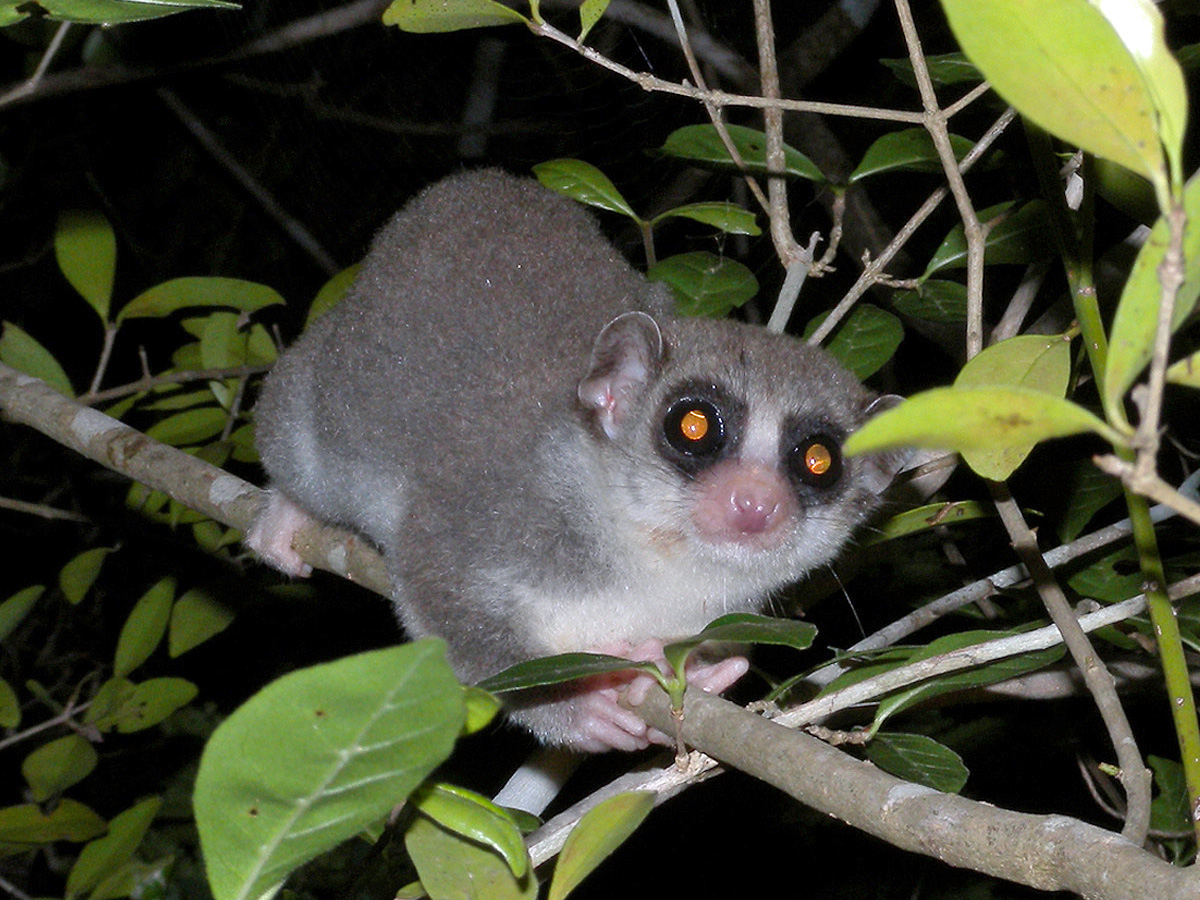
Fat-tailed dwarf lemur at Kirindy

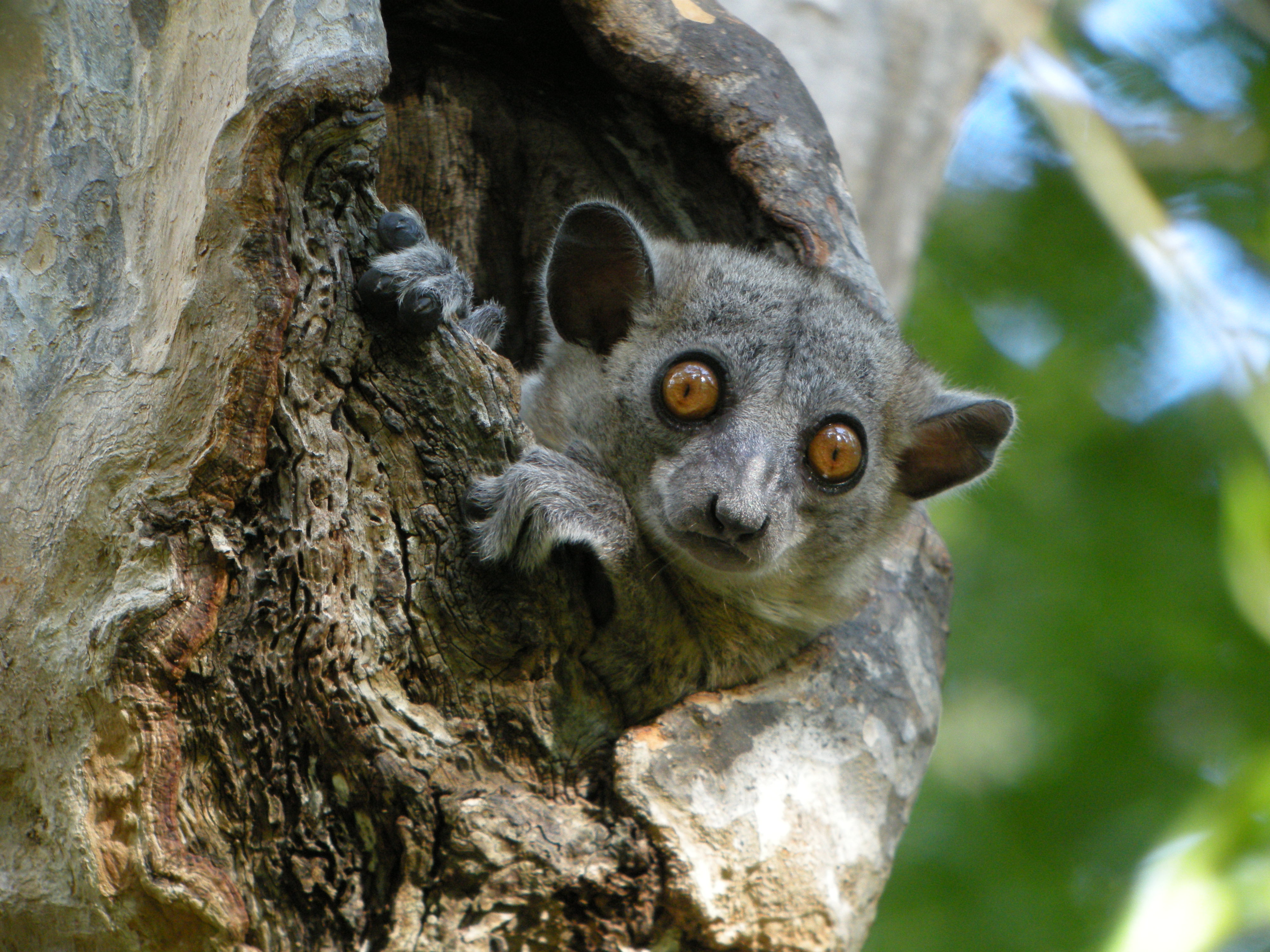
Red-tailed sportive lemur at Kirindy

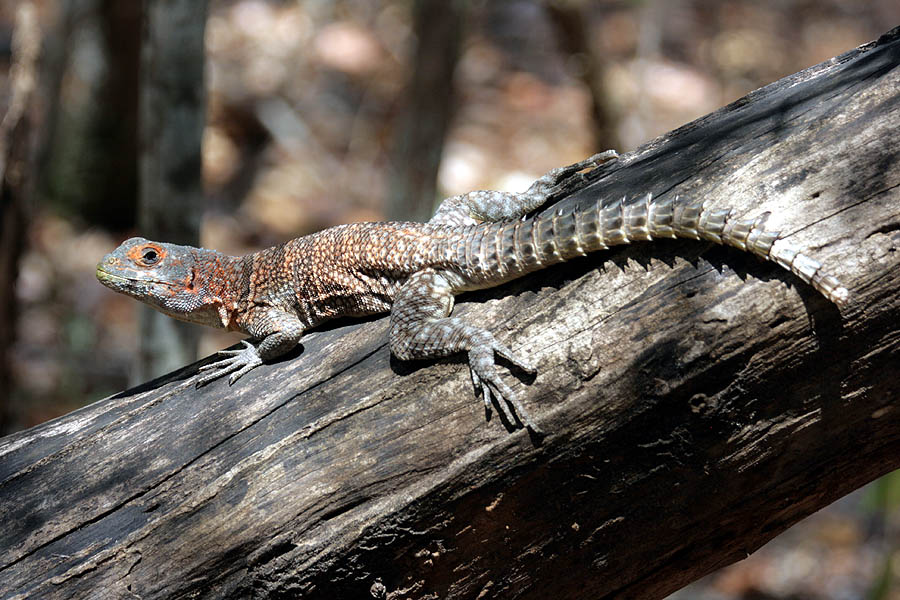
Oplurus cuvieri at Kirindy

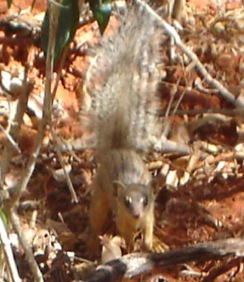
Narrow-striped Mongoose (Mungotictis decemlineata) at Kirindy

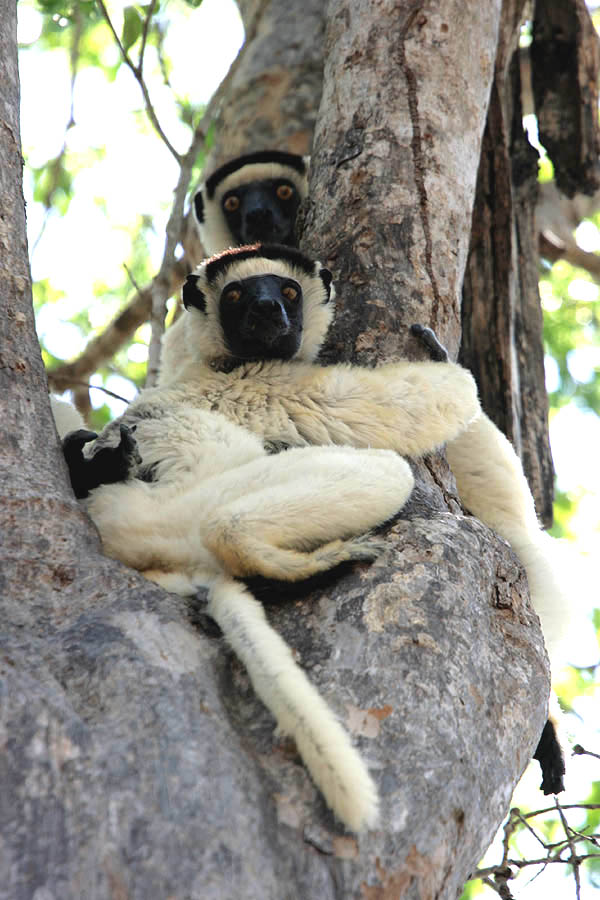
Verreaux's sifaka at Kirindy

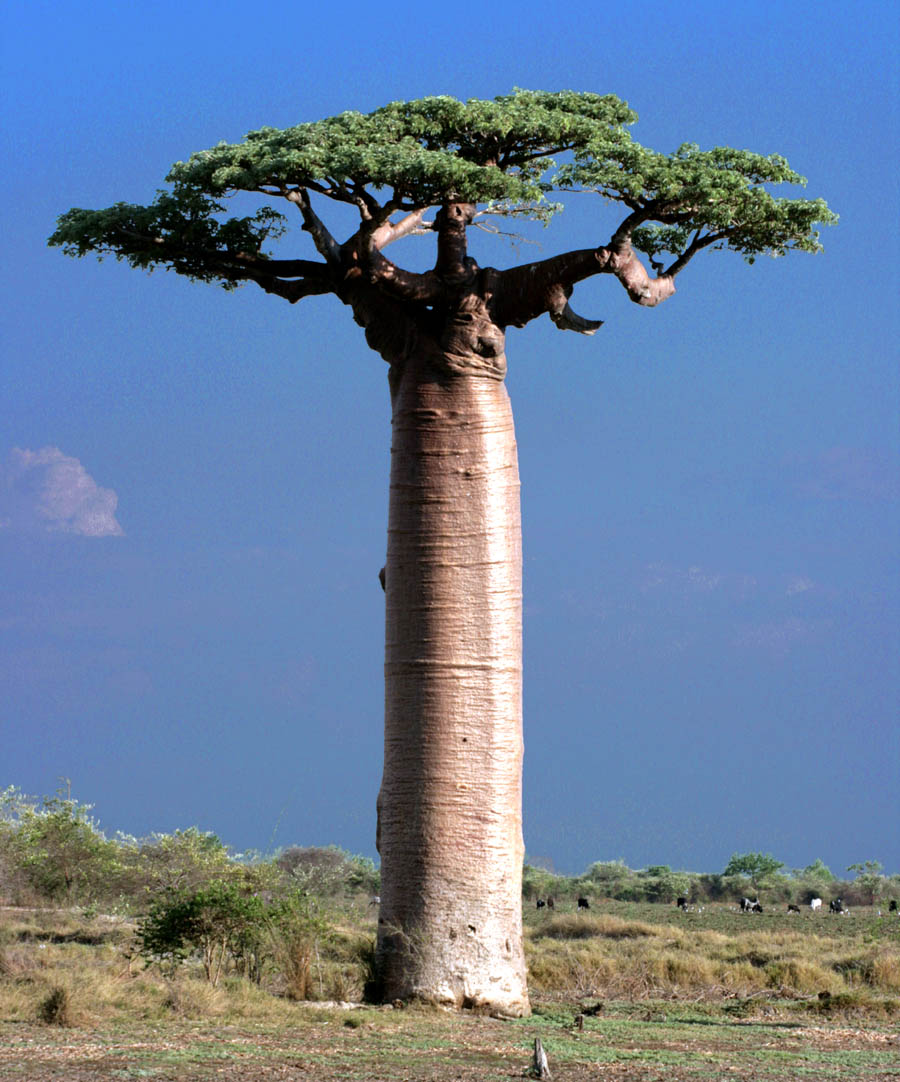
Adansonia grandidieri
