= Mandabe =

- Location in Madagascar
- Coordinates: 21°3′S 44°56′E
- Country: Madagascar
- Region: Menabe
- District: Mahabo
- Elevation: 289 m (948 ft)

Population (2001)
  - Total: 27,000
- Time zone: UTC3 (EAT)

Mandabe is a town and commune (Malagasy: kaominina) in Madagascar. It belongs to the district of Mahabo, which is a part of Menabe Region. The population of the commune was estimated to be approximately 27,000 in the 2001 commune census.

Mandabe Airport serves the commune. Primary and junior level secondary education are available in town. The town provides access to hospital services to its citizens. 95% of the population of the commune are farmers, while an additional 4.5% receive their livelihood from raising livestock. The most important crop is rice, while other important products are peanuts and cassava. Services provide employment for 0.5% of the population.

== Geography ==
The town is situated on the Maharivo River and is the end point of the RN 9.

== Personalities ==
- Andre Resampa (1924-1993), minister of interior
