= Betioky-Atsimo District =

Betioky Sud Betioky-Atsimo
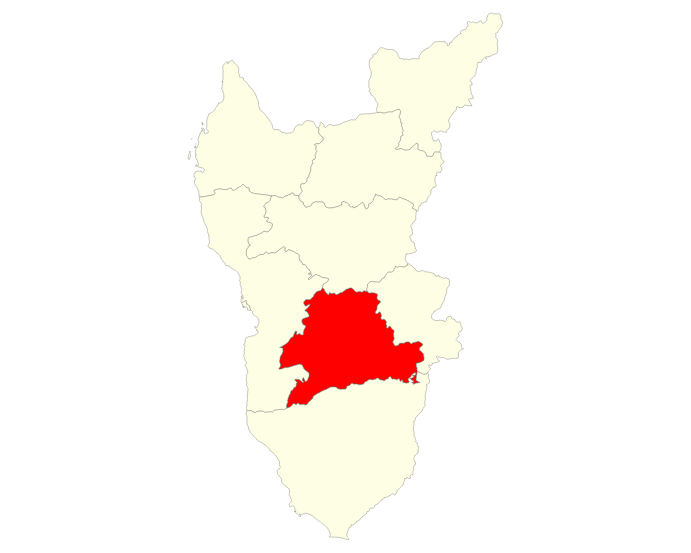
- Location of Betioky District in Atsimo Andrefana Region

- Location in Madagascar
- Coordinates: 23°43′S 44°23′E
- Country: Madagascar
- Region: Atsinanana
- District: Betioky-Atsimo

Government
  - District Chef: Robert Rafaralahy

Population (2015)
  - Total: 210,898
- Time zone: UTC3 (EAT)

Betioky is a town in Atsimo-Andrefana Region, Madagascar and is crossed by the Route nationale 10. An airport serves the town.

Betioky belongs to the poorest regions of Madagascar, where no facilities for tapped drinking water exist.

== Communes ==
The district is further divided into 22 communes:

- Ambatry Mitsinjo
- Andranomangatsiaka
- Ankazombalala
- Antohabato
- Beantake
- Beavoha
- Belamoty
- Betioky
- Bezaha
- Efoetsy
- Fenoandala
- Lazarivo
- Manalobe
- Masiaboay
- Montifeno
- Salobe
- Soamanonga
- Soaserana
- Tameantsoa
- Tanambao Ambony
- Tongobory
- Vatolatsaka

== Nature ==
The Beza Mahafaly Reserve lies approx. 35 km North-East of Betioky Sud.

== Religion ==
- EEM - Eklesia Episkopaly Malagasy (Anglican Church of Madagascar)

== Infrastructures ==
Bertioky is crossed by the unpaved National road 10.
