= Sakamasay =

- Location in Madagascar
- Coordinates: 23°53′S 44°39′E
- Country: Madagascar
- Region: Atsimo-Andrefana
- District: Betioky

Population (2000)
  - Ethnicities: Mahafaly
- Time zone: UTC3 (EAT)
- Postal code: 610

Sakamasay is a rural municipality in southwest Madagascar. It belongs to the district of Betioky, which is a part of Atsimo-Andrefana Region.

== Roads ==
This municipality is situated along the National road 10.
