= Maroarivo Ankazomanga =

- Location in Madagascar
- Coordinates: 23°29′S 44°08′E
- Country: Madagascar
- Region: Atsimo-Andrefana
- District: Betioky

Population
  - Total: 23,000
- Time zone: UTC3 (EAT)
- Postal code: 612

Maroarivo Ankazomanga is a rural municipality in southwest Madagascar. It belongs to the district of Betioky, which is a part of Atsimo-Andrefana Region. It is situated 65 kilometres (40 mi) from Betioky.

This is one of the driest and poorest regions of Madagascar. The main causes of mortality are: Malaria, diarrhea and respiratory diseases followed by tuberculosis.
