= Bezaha =

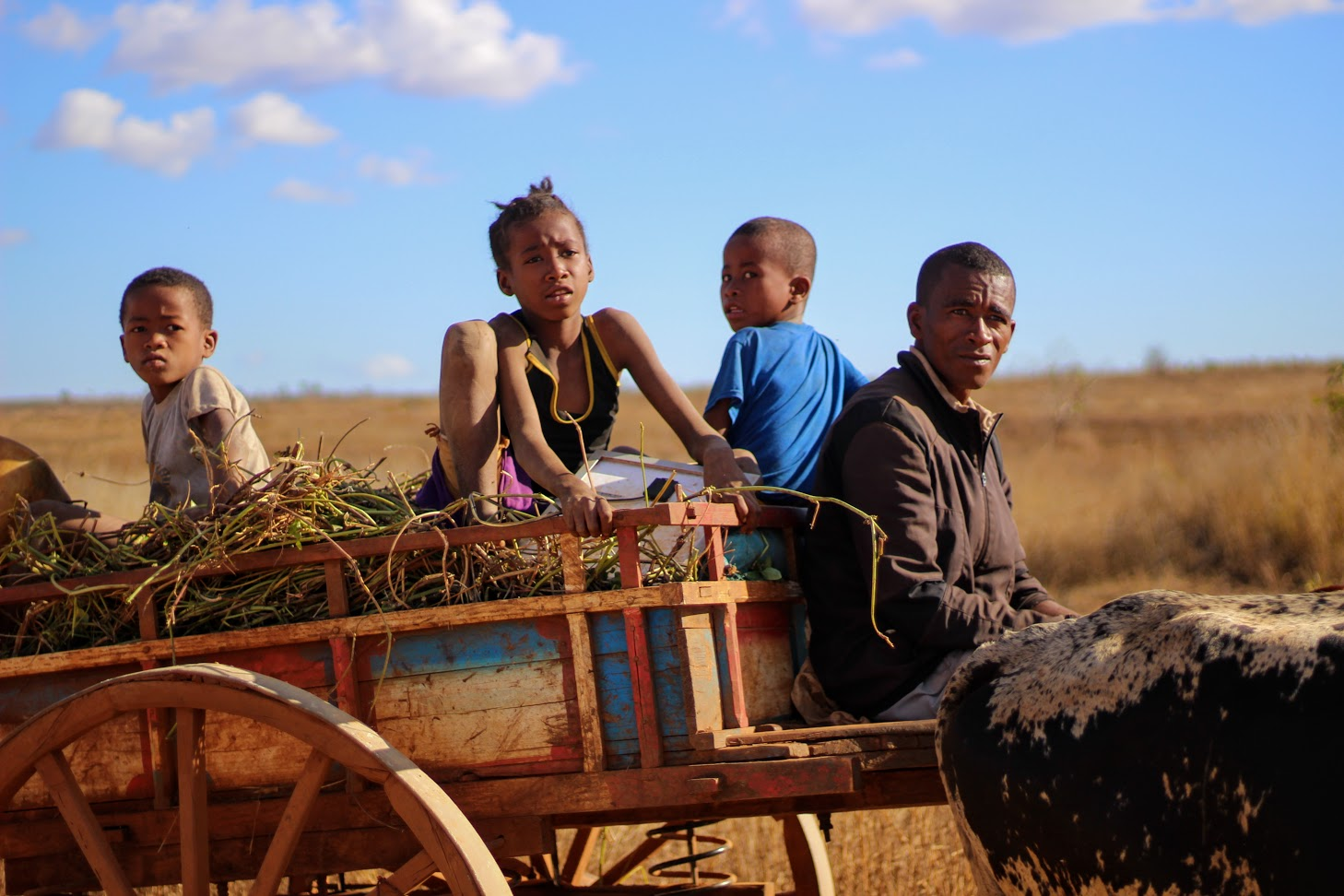
- Zebu cart near Bezaha

- Location in Madagascar
- Coordinates: 23°30′S 44°30′E
- Country: Madagascar
- Region: Atsimo-Andrefana
- District: Betioky
- Elevation: 124 m (407 ft)

Population (2001)
  - Total: 19,000
  - Ethnicities: Mahafaly
- Time zone: UTC3 (EAT)
- Postal code: 610

Bezaha is a municipality in southwest Madagascar. It belongs to the district of Betioky, which is a part of Atsimo-Andrefana Region. The population of the commune was estimated to be approximately 19,000 in 2001 commune census.

Bezaha is served by a local airport. In addition to primary schooling the town offers secondary education at both junior and senior levels. The town provides access to hospital services to its citizens.

Farming and raising livestock provide both employment for 45% of the working population. The most important crop is rice, while other important products are beans, cassava and sweet potatoes. Services provide employment for 10% of the population.

== Rivers ==
The municipality is crossed by the Onilahy River and the unpaved National road 17 A. It is situated at 59 km south-east of Andranovory and 22km east of Tongobory.
