= Mahafaly (disambiguation) =

The Mahafaly are an ethnic group of South Madagascar.

Mahafaly may also refer to:

- The Mahafaly language, a dialect of Malagasy language
- The Beza Mahafaly Reserve, a nature reserve in Madagascar
- The Mahafaly Plateau, a plateau in Madagascar
- Plateau Mahafaly - the 24th future region in Madagascar.
