= Tameantsoa =

- Location in Madagascar
- Coordinates: 23°32′S 44°18′E
- Country: Madagascar
- Region: Atsimo-Andrefana
- District: Betioky Atsimo
- Elevation: 78 m (256 ft)

Population (2001)
  - Total: 4,000
- Time zone: UTC3 (EAT)
- Postal code: 612

Tameantsoa is a rural municipality in southwest Madagascar. It belongs to the district of Betioky Atsimo (Betioky Sud), which is a part of Atsimo-Andrefana Region and is crossed by the Onilahy River and the Route nationale 10.

The population of the commune was estimated to be approximately 4,000 in 2001 commune census.

Only primary schooling is available. The majority 60% of the population of the commune are farmers, while an additional 25% receives their livelihood from raising livestock. The most important crop is beans, while other important products are maize, sweet potatoes and rice. Services provide employment for 5% of the population. Additionally fishing employs 10% of the population.

== Rivers ==
This municipality is crossed by the Onilahy River and the National Road 10 from Tulear to Fort-Dauphin.
