= Soamanonga =

- Location in Madagascar
- Coordinates: 24°21′S 44°31′E
- Country: Madagascar
- Region: Atsimo-Andrefana
- District: Betioky Sud
- Elevation: 443 m (1,453 ft)

Population (2001)
  - Total: 9,000
  - Ethnicities: Mahafaly
- Time zone: UTC3 (EAT)
- Postal code: 612

Soamanonga is a rural municipality in southwest Madagascar. It belongs to the district of Betioky Sud, which is a part of Atsimo-Andrefana Region. The population of the commune was estimated to be approximately 9,000 in 2001.

Only primary schooling is available. The majority 65% of the population of the commune are farmers, while an additional 35% receive their livelihood from raising livestock. The most important crops is rice but also mais and pistachios are important agricultural products for this municipality. Services provide employment for 5% of the population.

== Coal resources ==
In Ankinany, a fokontany (village) of this municipality, coal deposits were discovered in 2007.
