= Tongobory =

- Location in Madagascar
- Coordinates: 23°31′S 44°20′E
- Country: Madagascar
- Region: Atsimo-Andrefana
- District: Betioky
- Elevation: 88 m (289 ft)

Population (2001)
  - Total: 21,000
- Time zone: UTC3 (EAT)
- Postal code: 612

Tongobory is a rural municipality in southwest Madagascar. It belongs to the district of Betioky, which is a part of Atsimo-Andrefana Region. The population of the commune was estimated to be approximately 21,000 in 2001 commune census.

Primary and junior level secondary education are available in town. Farming and raising livestock provides employment for 40% and 15% of the working population. The most important crops are maize and beans, while other important agricultural products are sweet potatoes and lima beans. Services provide employment for 5% of the population. Additionally fishing employs 40% of the population.

== Geography ==
Tongobory is situated at the Onilahy River and at a distance of 65 km from Andranovory. The commune is crossed by the RN 10. Also the Lake Iotry is in this municipality.

== Personalities ==
- Jean Lahiniriko (*1956) - politician
