= Efoetsy =

- Village
- Location in Madagascar
- Coordinates: 24°4′41″S 43°41′55″E
- Country: Madagascar
- Region: Atsimo-Andrefana
- District: Betioky Sud
- Postal code: 602

Efoetsy is a village in the commune of Betioky Sud in southwest Madagascar. It is connected by road to Ankiririsa in the northwest and Toliara, which is about 58 kilometres to the northwest. It lies just west of the northwestern bank of the Lake Tsimanampetsotsa. Behazomby lies to the south of the village.

== Fokontany (villages) ==
This municipality includes the villages 7 villages: Efoetsy, Maromitiliky, Manasy, Behazomby, Ambola, Maintelime and Marompijery.

== National Parks ==
The Tsimanampetsotsa National Park lies in this municipality.
