= Plateau Mahafaly =

- (future) Region
- Country: Madagascar
- Capital: Ampanihy Ouest

Area
  - Total: 28,459 km^{2} (10,988 sq mi)

Population (2018)
  - Total: 951,653
  - Density: 33.439/km^{2} (86.608/sq mi)
- Time zone: UTC3 (EAT)

Plateau Mahafaly will be the 24th region of Madagascar. It will be created by dividing the former region of Atsimo-Andrefana. Its capital is Ampanihy Ouest.

== Administrative divisions ==
Plateau Mahafaly will cover three districts, 59 communes and 762 fokontany (villages) with a population of 951653 inhabitants:

- Ampanihy Ouest (district)
- Benenitra (district)
- Betioky-Atsimo (district)
