= Antanosy people =

Malagasy ethnic group

Antanosy
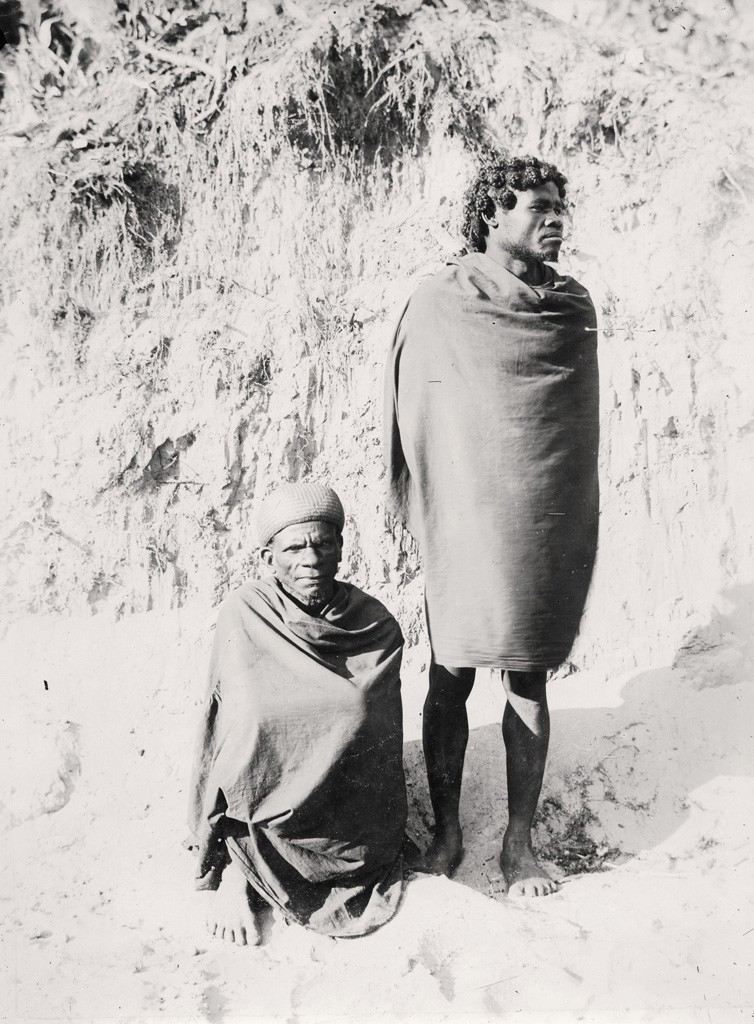
- Antanosy men, c. 1900

Total population
- 772 000

Regions with significant populations
- Madagascar

Languages
- Tanosy

Related ethnic groups
- Other Malagasy groups, Austronesian peoples, Bantu peoples

The Antanosy ("people of the island") is a Malagasy ethnic group who primarily live in the Anosy region of southeastern Madagascar, though there are also Antanosy living near Bezaha, where some of the Antanosy moved after the Merina people conquered Anosy. An estimated 360,000 people identify as Antanosy as of 2013.

== Ethnic identity ==
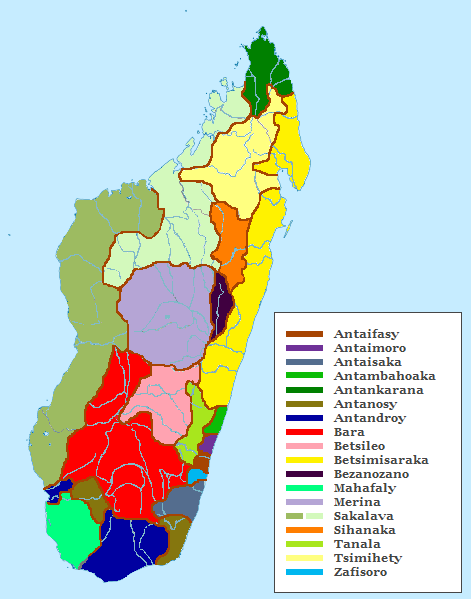
Distribution of Malagasy ethnic groups

The Antanosy constitute approximately two percent of the total population, forming one of the smallest Malagasy ethnic groups both in size and in traditional territory. They primarily live in the Anosy region of southeastern Madagascar, though there are also Antanosy living near Bezaha, where some of the Antanosy moved after the Merina people conquered Anosy.

== History ==
9th to 12th centuries – Maliovola phase of Anosy with evidence of both cattle herding and fishing. Gardening and hunting also assumed.^{[]}

13th century

- Ambinanibe phase of Anosy shows the introduction of ironworking and some signs of connections with broader Indian Ocean exchange networks with little evidence of settlement hierarchy or social differences and little change in population.^{[]}
- Began importing "celadon" from China, which lasted until the 15th century.

14th century

- Arrival of the Zafiraminia in Madagascar according to Racoube, the grand ancestor in Anosy.

15th century

- Tranovato phase of middle and upper Efaho valley of Anosy where communities were fortified and stratified, with the rise of 'Paramount Chiefdoms.' This was a time of military campaigns and rice cultivation. Ceramics were imported from China, England, France and Portugal. Cattle were exported.^{[]}

16th century

- Continuation of Tranovato phase of Anosy.
- 1529 – French sailor Jean Parmentier describes the ocean of eastern Madagascar as "La Mere Sans Raison."

17th century

- 1613 – Portuguese land at Manafiafy where they are met by king Andriantsiambany and 500 of his soldiers.
- Ehoala phase of Anosy with focus on irrigated rice, but manioc had also been introduced. Settlements were smaller and located primarily in upper valleys away from the coast. Cattle and slaves continued to be exported.^{[7]}
- mid-17th century – Rise of Zafiraminia rule of Efaho valley as they become the key connection between French and the rest of Anosy. The capital was Fanjahira, ruled by king Andriambahoaka Andriandramaka, son of the former king Andriantsiambany who the Portuguese had met at Manafiafy.
- 1643–73 – Several different Governors of Fort Dauphin sought to conquer Anosy, pillaging and then burning hundreds of villages, killing thousands of Malagasy, enslaving others and stealing tens of thousands of cattle. During this time French living there also fought for several of the Anosy kings. At this point, there were an estimated 10,000 Antanosy living near Fort Dauphin, with the total population of Anosy several times this number.^{[25][26]} For more information on these 30 years, see Tolanaro. For more information on work by the Roman Catholic Church in Anosy during the 16th and 17th centuries, see Roman Catholic Diocese of Tôlagnaro.
- 1674 – Fort Dauphin evacuated and fort and settlement closed after over half of the French population living there at that time were killed.^{[25]}

18th century

19th century

- 1811 – Jean Rene, son of a French settler of Fort Dauphin and an Antanosy mom, became Governor of Toamasina, first under British and then under Radama's rule. He took a blood oath with Radama in 1817 and is a powerful ally until his death in 1826.
- 1825 – Anosy, including Fort Dauphin, conquered by the Imerina, led by Ramananolona who was then appointed to head the commercial establishment at Fort Dauphin. When asked by the French to in turn kill the new queen of Imerina, Ranavalona, she secretly ordered Ramananolona's second in command to kill him at which point this junior officer inherited all his commander's land and slaves and became the new Imerina Governor at Fort Dauphin.
- 1840s–60s – The occupation of Anosy by the Imerina resulted in the migration of 80,000 Antanosy who moved west to the Onilahy River valley near Betioky and Bezaha to escape Imerina rule, with 30,000 moving together in 1845.
- mid-19th century – Some Antanosy become part of the specialized porterage system of the Imerina kingdom, returning to Anosy with their earnings after completing their contracts.
- 1850s – Leather craft skills introduced by the LMS spread to Anosy when those skilled in this area fled Imerina fanompoana.
- 1895 – Madagascar conquered by France.

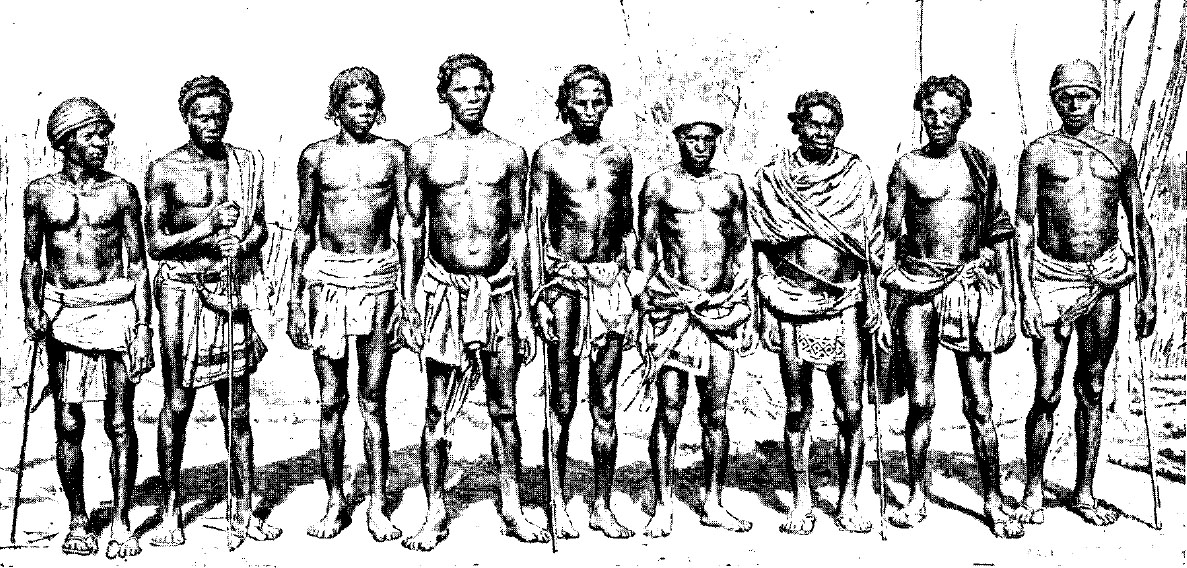
Antanosy warriors, circa 1908

20th century

- 1940 – Vichy France takes over control of Madagascar.
- 1942 – British forces replace Vichy France's control of Madagascar with that of the Free French, invading Fort Dauphin in 1942.
- 1959 – 148,132 Antanosy.
- 1965 – Population of the Antanosy estimated to be 148,132.
- 1980s – Anosy region becomes a high priority area for conservation efforts resulting in the influx of a wide variety of international NGOs who begin work in this area.
- 1996 – Anosy region is identified as one of the ecologically most diverse regions of Madagascar

21st century

- 2005 – World Hunger Program responds to malnutrition in Anosy caused by a combination of drought and flooding.

== Society ==
The ancestors of today's Antanosy migrated from the north about 150–200 years ago. According to MAEP (2003), they are divided into three groups in the region:

- The Antavaratra Region of Manantenina (an alliance between Antanosy and Antaisaka)
- Those occupying the Antambolo Valley in the region of Ranomafana and Enaniliha
- The Antatsimo who live in the southwest region of Anosy, from Ranopiso to the Mandrare river

While one source indicates there are five sub-ethnic groups of the Antanosy people (the Tesák, Ivondro, Tevatomalama, and Terara Temanalo) Rakotoarisoa indicates from the north of Anosy they are known as the Tavaratra (Manantenina region, though some indicate the people in Manantenina are the Temanantenina, with the Tavaratra located between the Temanantenina and the Tambato), the Tambolo (Ranomafana region), the Tambato (Mahatalaky and Manafiafy region), the Tanosy (Fanjahira region) and the Tatsimo (Ranopiso region). However, this is still a simplification of a more complex reality, as in central Anosy alone there are 30 village clans.

Another way to describe the Antanosy is to focus on the Zafiraminia people who arrived in Anosy in the 16th Century, conquering those already living there, and whose former dynasty is bounded by cemeteries named Enosiavaratse (Manarivo), Enosy atsimo (Andromira) and Samby Anosy (Ifarantsa). For a picture of Antanosy warriors see)

== Language ==
The Antanosy speak a dialect of the Malagasy language, which is a branch of the Malayo-Polynesian language group derived from the Barito languages, spoken in southern Borneo.

== Economy ==
Most Antanosy practice subsistence farming and sell their agricultural products, including rice and manioc. Many also use and sell products taken from the forest, including thatch for house roofing, honey, bush meat, fruits and mushrooms, and medicinal plant materials. Commerce most frequently occurs during local weekly markets, as the majority live in remote rural villages with low populations.

== See also ==
- Anosy

== Bibliography ==
- Bradt, Hilary; Austin, Daniel (2007). Madagascar (9th ed.). Guilford, CT: The Globe Pequot Press Inc. pp. 113–115. ISBN 978-1-84162-197-5.
- Diagram Group (2013). Encyclopedia of African Peoples. San Francisco, CA: Routledge. ISBN 9781135963415.
- Ogot, Bethwell A. (1992). Africa from the Sixteenth to the Eighteenth Century. Paris: UNESCO. ISBN 9789231017117.
