= Théodore Léonard Randriamanga =

Malagasy politician

Théodore Léonard Randriamanga is a Malagasy politician. A member of the National Assembly of Madagascar, he was elected as a member of the Tiako I Madagasikara party in the 2002 Malagasy parliamentary elections and reelected in 2007. He represents the constituency of Ampanihy West.
