= Route nationale 10 (Madagascar) =

Road in Madagascar

Route information
- Length: 512 km (318 mi)

Major junctions
- to end: RN 13 (Ambovombe)
- from RN 7 Madagascar

Location
- Country: Madagascar

Highway system
- Roads in Madagascar

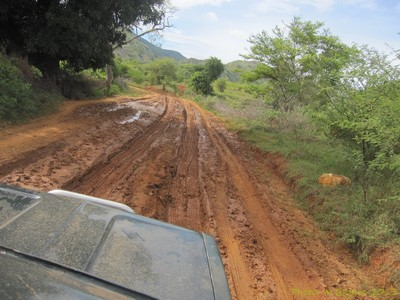
another unpaved Route nationale in Madagascar

Route nationale 10 (RN 10) is an unpaved, secondary highway in Madagascar of 512 km, running from Andranovory to Ambovombe. It crosses the regions of Atsimo-Andrefana and Androy.

== Selected locations on route ==
West to East:

- Andranovory - intersection with RN 7 (Tulear - Fianarantsoa - Antananarivo)
- Tameantsoa - Onilahy River crossing
- Betioky - Beza Mahafaly Reserve at 35 km north-east
- Ambatry
- Mahazoarivo - intersection secondary road to Vohitsara and Akazomateila (Mahafaly graves) & Tsimanampetsotse National Park
- Ejeda - dirt road to the coast to Itampolo & Linta River crossing
- Manakaralahy - Manakaralahy River crossing
- Sakoambe
- Ampanihy
- Tranoroa - Menarandra River crossing
- Andamilamy
- Beloha
- Tsiombe
- Ambondro
- Ambovombe - intersection with RN 13 (Ihosy - Tolagnaro (Fort-Dauphin))
- Tolagnaro (Fort-Dauphin))

== See also ==
- List of roads in Madagascar
- Transport in Madagascar
