= Madagascar spiny forests =

Ecoregion in Southwest Madagascar

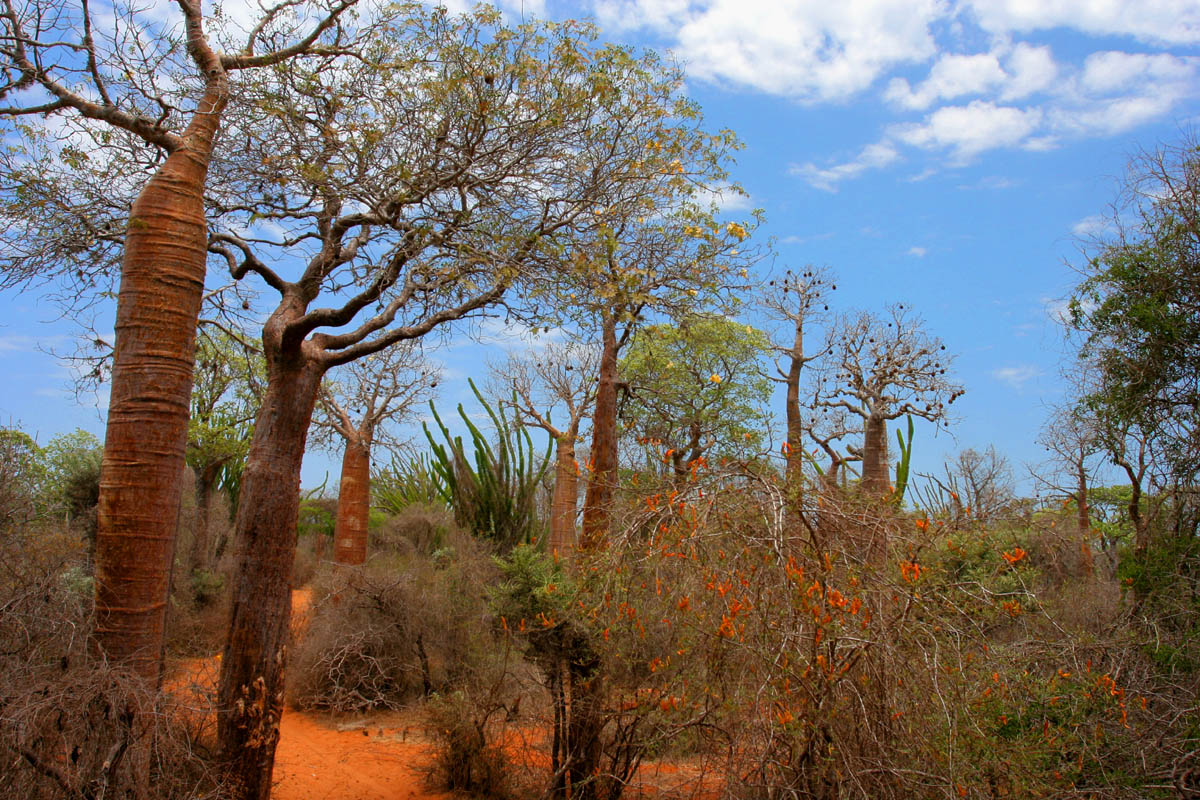
- Spiny forest at Ifaty, featuring various Adansonia (baobab) species, Alluaudia procera (Madagascar ocotillo) and other vegetation

Ecology
- Realm: Afrotropical
- Biome: Deserts and xeric shrublands
- Borders: Madagascar succulent woodlands; Madagascar lowland forests

Geography
- Area: 43,400 km^{2} (16,800 sq mi)
- Country: Madagascar
- Elevation: 55–200 metres (180–656 ft)
- Coordinates: 24°54′S 44°12′E
- Geology: Limestone and red sand
- Climate type: Hot desert climate (BWh)
- Soil types: sandy

Conservation
- Conservation status: critical/endangered
- Global 200: yes
- Protected: 8.31%

The Madagascar spiny forests (also known as the Madagascar spiny thickets) is an ecoregion in the southwest of Madagascar. The vegetation type is found on poor substrates with low, erratic winter rainfall. The ecoregion contains an outstanding proportion of endemic plant species and is listed as one of the 200 most important ecological regions in the world; one of the Global 200.

== Flora ==
This is the area with the highest level of plant endemism in Madagascar, with 48% of the genera and 95% of the species endemic. Many constituent plants show extreme adaptations to drought. Spiny plants of the endemic subfamily Didiereoideae form a conspicuous component, especially towards the east. They are woody but distantly related to the cacti. The remaining component of the forests is dominated by members of the plant families Burseraceae, Euphorbiaceae, Anacardiaceae and Fabaceae, all of which have representatives elsewhere.

== Fauna ==
Notable inhabitants of the spiny thickets include the spider tortoise (Pyxis arachnoides) and the radiated tortoise (Astrochelys radiata), the gecko Ebenavia maintimainty, several lemurs including Verreaux's sifaka, Grandidier's mongoose, and eight endemic birds.

== Conservation ==
8.31% of the ecoregion is in protected areas. including Tsimanampetsotsa National Park, Berenty Reserve, Beza Mahafaly Reserve, and Cap Sainte Marie Special Reserve. Andohahela National Park offers limited protection through its 'Parcel Three' section. Elsewhere the spiny forest habitat is under pressure from human exploitation. The main impacting activities are burning for conversion to farming and grazing land, harvesting for charcoal and firewood, and logging for construction. The Arboretum d'Antsokay is a botanical garden near Toliara dedicated to preserving the flora of the spiny forest.

== Extent ==
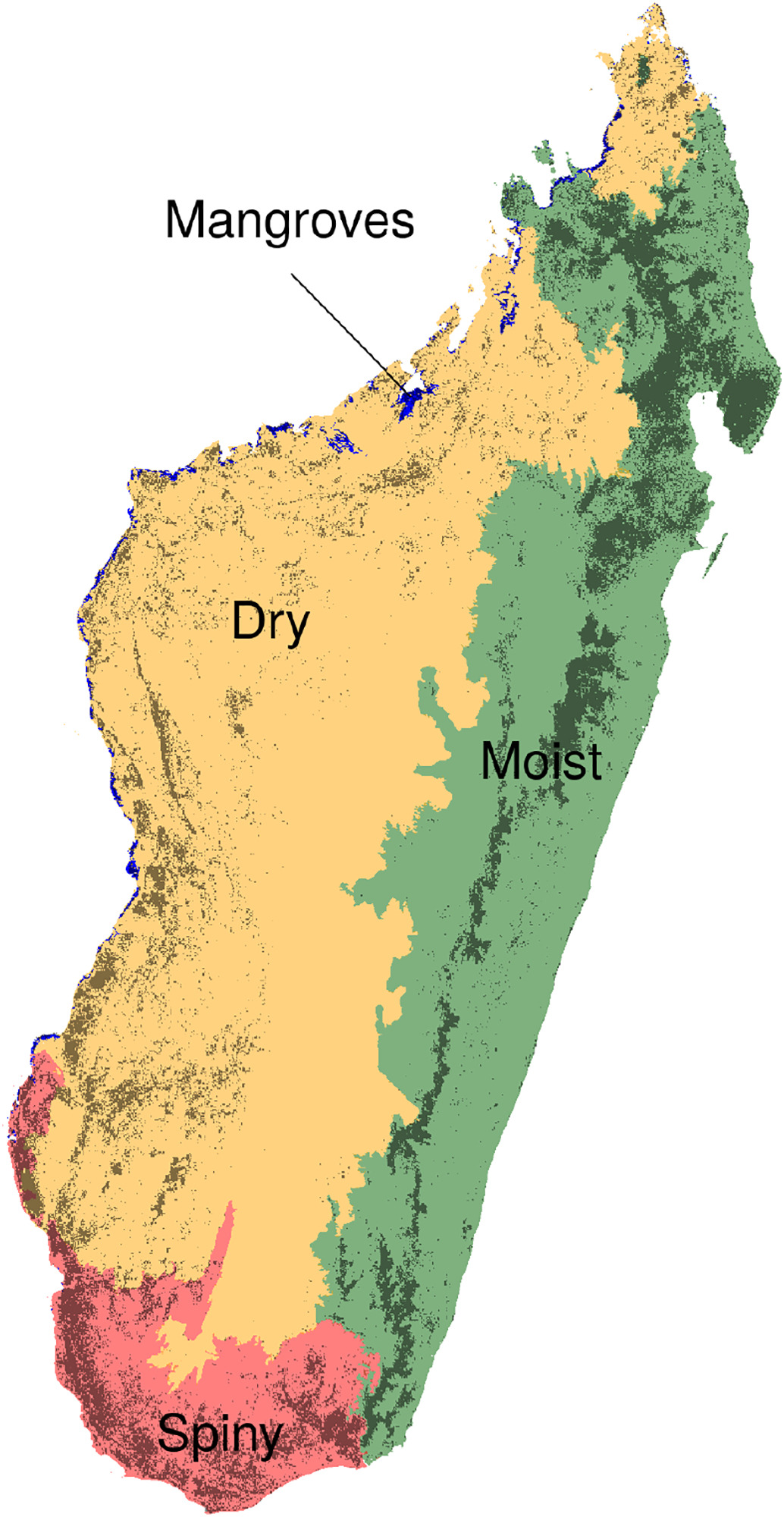
Ecoregions and forest types in Madagascar

As shown on the map on the right, Madagascar can be divided into four climatic ecoregions with four forest types: the moist forest in the East (green), the dry forest in the West (orange), the spiny forest in the South (red), and the mangrove forest on the West coast (blue). Ecoregions were defined following climatic and vegetation criteria. The dark grey areas represent the remaining natural forest cover for the year 2014. Forest types are defined on the basis of their belonging to one of the four ecoregions.

== See also ==
- Ecoregions of Madagascar
- Flora of Madagascar
- Moringa (genus)
- Sakoa

== External links and bibliography ==
- For extent, fragmentation and intact sections, see: A refined classification of the primary vegetation of Madagascar based on the underlying geology, Du Puy and Moat, 1996.
- For dominant plant families, see: Structure and floristic composition of the vegetation in the Réserve Naturelle Intégrale d’Andohahela, Madagascar, Rakotomalaza and Messmer, 1999.
- "Madagascar spiny thickets". Terrestrial Ecoregions. World Wildlife Fund.
- Madagascar spiny thickets (Encyclopedia of the Earth)
