= Ambatry Mitsinjo =

- Location in Madagascar
- Coordinates: 23°51′S 44°25′E
- Country: Madagascar
- Region: Atsimo-Andrefana
- District: Betioky Atsimo
- Founded: 26.04.1995
- Time zone: UTC3 (EAT)
- Postal code: 612

Ambatry Mitsinjo is a rural municipality in southwest Madagascar. It belongs to the district of Betioky Atsimo (Betioky Sud), which is a part of Atsimo-Andrefana Region.
