= Betioky mine =

Iron mine in Atsimo-Andrefana, Madagascar

- Location: Betioky Sud, Atsimo-Andrefana, Madagascar
- Products: Iron ore

The Betioky mine is a large iron mine located in Betioky Sud in southern Madagascar, region of Atsimo-Andrefana. Betioky represents one of the largest iron ore reserves in Madagascar and in the world having estimated reserves of 130 million tonnes of ore grading 14% iron metal.

== See also ==
- Mining industry of Madagascar
