= Andranomangatsiaka =

- Location in Madagascar
- Coordinates: 23°19′S 44°35′E
- Country: Madagascar
- Region: Atsimo-Andrefana
- District: Betioky Sud
- Elevation: 256 m (840 ft)

Population (2001)
  - Total: 10,000
- Time zone: UTC3 (EAT)

Andranomangatsiaka is a town and commune (Malagasy: kaominina) in southwest Madagascar. It belongs to the district of Betioky Sud, which is a part of Atsimo-Andrefana Region. The population of the commune was estimated to be approximately 10,000 in 2001 commune census.

Only primary schooling is available. The majority 70% of the population of the commune are farmers, while an additional 25% receives their livelihood from raising livestock. The most important crop is rice, while other important products are sugarcane, cassava and sweet potatoes. Services provide employment for 5% of the population.
