= Antohabato =

- Location in Madagascar
- Coordinates: 23°33′S 44°27′E
- Country: Madagascar
- Region: Atsimo-Andrefana
- District: Betioky Sud
- Elevation: 98 m (322 ft)

Population (2001)
  - Total: 7,000
- Time zone: UTC3 (EAT)

Antohabato is a town and commune (Malagasy: kaominina) in southwest Madagascar. It belongs to the district of Betioky Sud, which is a part of Atsimo-Andrefana Region. The population of the commune was estimated to be approximately 7,000 in 2001 commune census.

Only primary schooling is available. The majority 80% of the population of the commune are farmers, while an additional 15% receives their livelihood from raising livestock. The most important crop is beans, while other important products are onions and rice. Services provide employment for 5% of the population.
