= Fiherenana River =

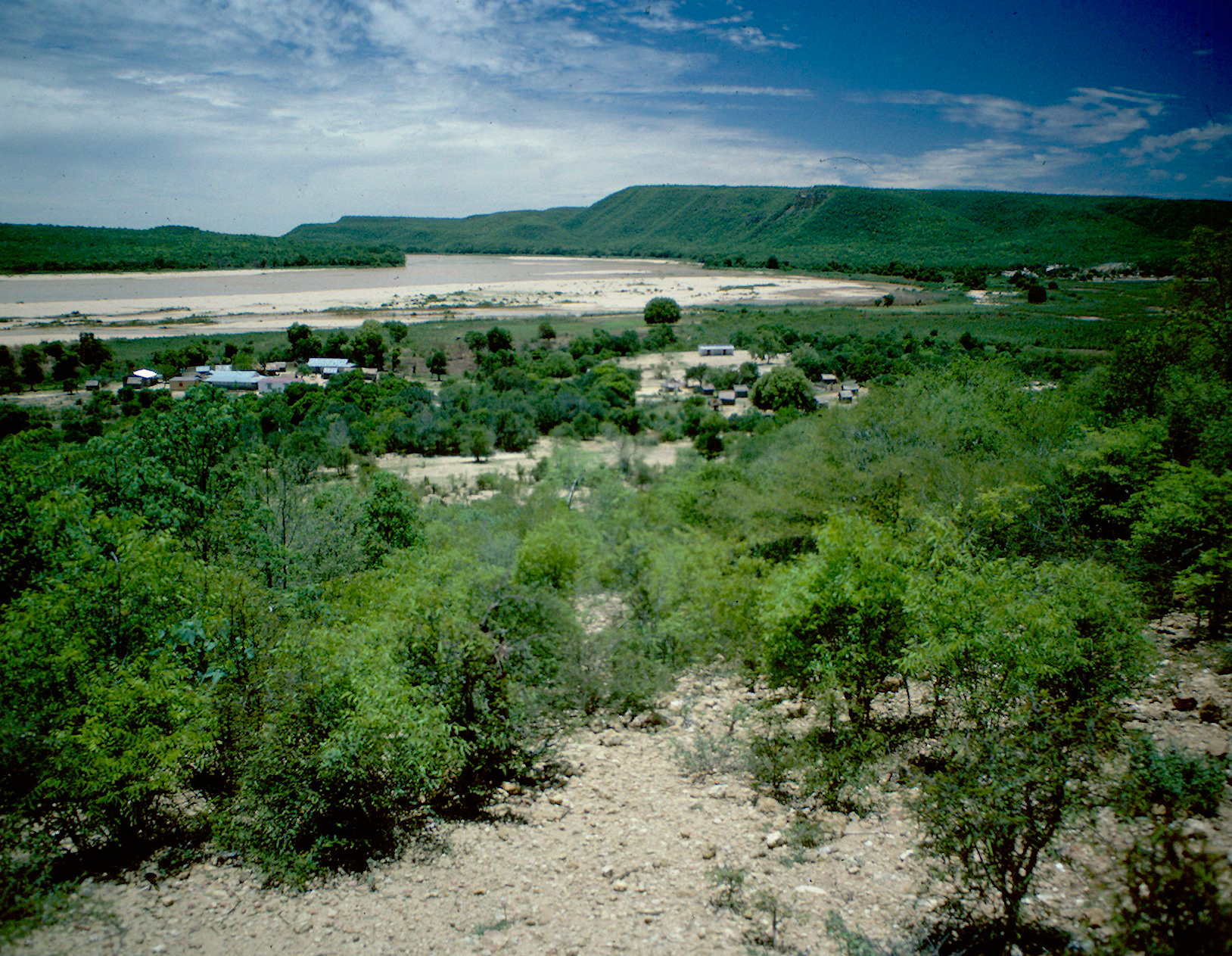
- Fiherenana River

Location
- Country: Madagascar
- Region: Atsimo-Andrefana
- Cities: Beantsy, Tulear

Physical characteristics
- Mouth: Indian Ocean
  - location: Belalanda, near Tulear, Atsimo-Andrefana
  - coordinates: 23°18′35″S 43°37′50″E
  - elevation: 0 m (0 ft)
- Basin size: 7,500 km^{2} (2,900 sq mi)to 7,740.8 km^{2} (2,988.7 mi^{2})
- Discharge
  - location: Near mouth
  - average: (Period: 1971–2000)16.9 m^{3}/s (600 cu ft/s)
- Discharge
  - location: Mahaboboka
  - average: 35.4 m^{3}/s (1,250 cu ft/s)

Basin features
- River system: Fiherenana River

The Fiherenana is a river in the region of Atsimo-Andrefana in southern Madagascar. It flows into the Indian Ocean at Tulear. Due to a local fady (taboo), pirogues are not allowed on the river.

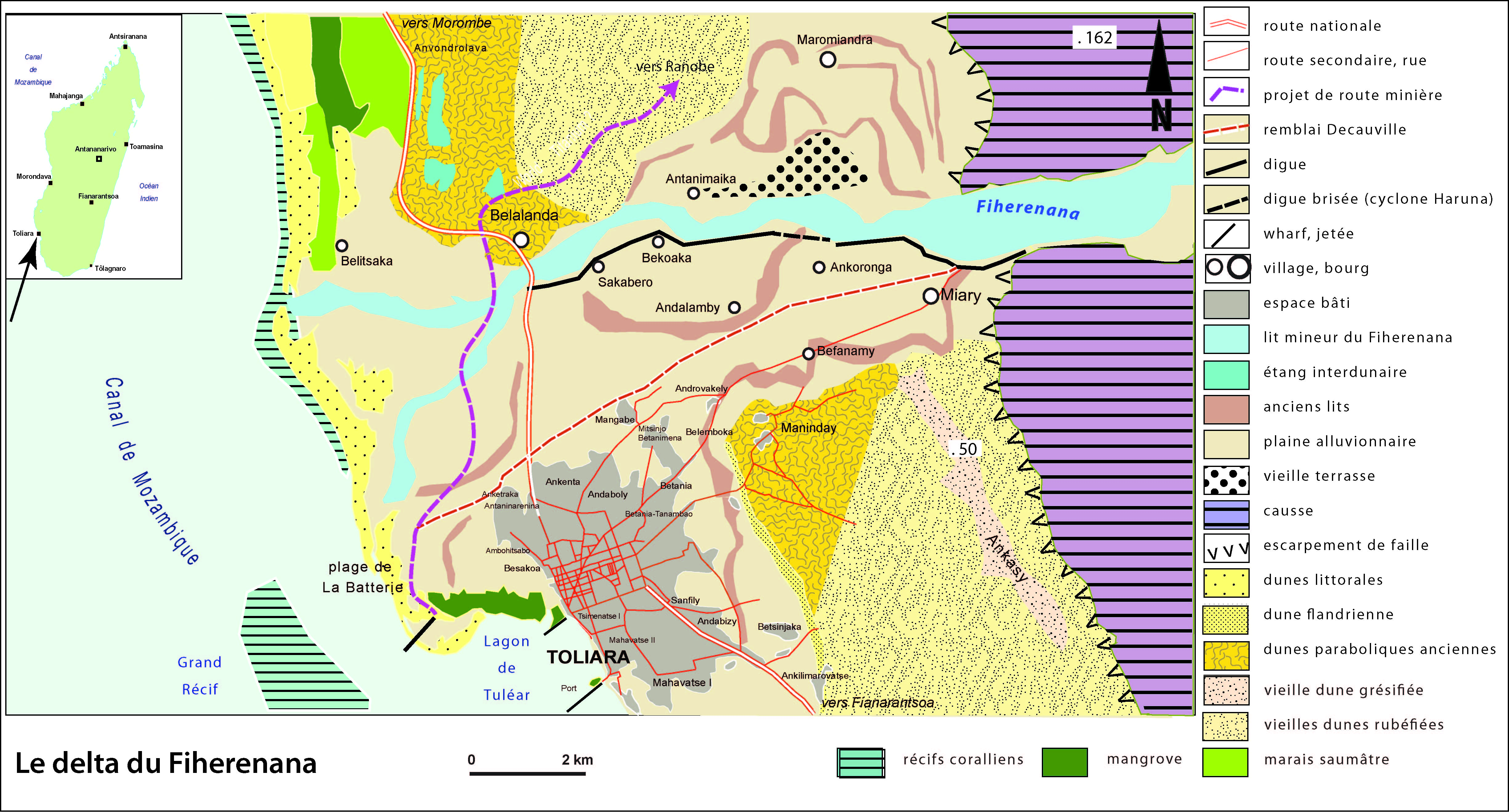
The Fiherenana delta
