= Belamoty =

- Location in Madagascar
- Coordinates: 23°33′S 44°48′E
- Country: Madagascar
- Region: Atsimo-Andrefana
- District: Betioky Sud
- Elevation: 156 m (512 ft)

Population (2001)
  - Total: 19,000
  - Ethnicities: Bara
- Time zone: UTC3 (EAT)

Belamoty is a town and commune (Malagasy: kaominina) in southwest Madagascar. It belongs to the district of Betioky Sud, which is a part of Atsimo-Andrefana Region. The population of the commune was estimated to be approximately 19,000 in 2001 commune census.

Primary and junior level secondary education are available in town. The majority 80% of the population of the commune are farmers, while an additional 10% receives their livelihood from raising livestock. The most important crops are rice and cassava, while other important agricultural products are beans and tomato. Services provide employment for 8% of the population. Additionally fishing employs 2% of the population.

== Geography ==
Belamoty is situated at the Onilahy River.
