= Masiaboay =

- Location in Madagascar
- Coordinates: 23°54′S 44°28′E
- Country: Madagascar
- Region: Atsimo-Andrefana
- District: Betioky Sud
- Elevation: 245 m (804 ft)

Population (2001)
  - Total: 10,000
- Time zone: UTC3 (EAT)

Masiaboay is a town and commune (Malagasy: kaominina) in southwest Madagascar. It belongs to the district of Betioky Sud, which is a part of Atsimo-Andrefana Region. The population of the commune was estimated to be approximately 10,000 in 2001 commune census.

Only primary schooling is available. The majority 60% of the population of the commune are farmers, while an additional 39% receives their livelihood from raising livestock. The most important crops are cassava and maize, while other important agricultural products are peanuts and sweet potatoes. Services provide employment for 1% of the population.
