= Tanambao Ambony =

- Interactive map of Tanambao Ambony
- Country: Madagascar
- Region: Atsimo-Andrefana
- District: Betioky Sud

Population (2001)
  - Total: 3,000
- Time zone: UTC3 (EAT)

Tanambao Ambony is a town and commune (Malagasy: kaominina) in southwest Madagascar. It belongs to the district of Betioky Sud, which is a part of Atsimo-Andrefana Region. The population of the commune was estimated to be approximately 3,000 in 2001 commune census.

Only primary schooling is available. The majority 60% of the population of the commune are farmers, while an additional 38% receives their livelihood from raising livestock. The most important crops are cassava and tomatoes, while other important agricultural products are maize and rice. Services provide employment for 2% of the population.
