= Beavoha =

- Location in Madagascar
- Coordinates: 23°35′S 44°42′E
- Country: Madagascar
- Region: Atsimo-Andrefana
- District: Betioky
- Elevation: 155 m (509 ft)

Population (2001)
  - Total: 8,000
- Time zone: UTC3 (EAT)

Beavoha is a town and commune (Malagasy: kaominina) in southwest Madagascar. It belongs to the district of Betioky, which is a part of Atsimo-Andrefana Region. The population of the commune was estimated to be approximately 8,000 in 2001 commune census.

Only primary schooling is available. The majority 70% of the population of the commune are farmers, while an additional 28% receives their livelihood from raising livestock. The most important crops are beans and onions; also peanuts are an important agricultural product. Services provide employment for 2% of the population.
