= Beantake =

- Location in Madagascar
- Coordinates: 23°48′S 44°18′E
- Country: Madagascar
- Region: Atsimo-Andrefana
- District: Betioky Sud
- Elevation: 261 m (856 ft)

Population (2001)
  - Total: 18,000
- Time zone: UTC3 (EAT)

Beantake is a town and commune (Malagasy: kaominina) in southwest Madagascar. It belongs to the district of Betioky Sud, which is a part of Atsimo-Andrefana Region. The population of the commune was estimated to be approximately 18,000 in 2001 commune census.

Only primary schooling is available. The majority 60% of the population of the commune are farmers, while an additional 39.5% receives their livelihood from raising livestock. The most important crops are cassava and peanuts; also maize is an important agricultural product. Services provide employment for 0.5% of the population.
