= Soaserana, Betioky Sud =

Soaserana
- Location in Madagascar
- Coordinates: 23°53′S 44°54′E
- Country: Madagascar
- Region: Atsimo-Andrefana
- District: Betioky Sud
- Elevation: 468 m (1,535 ft)

Population (2001)
  - Total: 8,000
- Time zone: UTC3 (EAT)

Soaserana is a town and commune (Malagasy: kaominina) in southwest Madagascar. It belongs to the district of Betioky Sud, which is a part of Atsimo-Andrefana Region. The population of the commune was estimated to be approximately 8,000 in 2001 commune census.

Only primary schooling is available. It is also a site of industrial-scale mining. The majority 55% of the population of the commune are farmers, while an additional 40% receives their livelihood from raising livestock. The most important crops are peanuts and rice, while other important agricultural products are maize and cassava. Services provide employment for 5% of the population.
