= Andranovory =

- Location in Madagascar
- Coordinates: 23°8′S 44°8′E
- Country: Madagascar
- Region: Atsimo-Andrefana
- District: Toliara II
- Elevation: 474 m (1,555 ft)

Population (2001)
  - Total: 31,000
- Time zone: UTC3 (EAT)

Andranovory is a town and commune (Malagasy: kaominina) in Madagascar. It belongs to the district of Toliara II, which is a part of Atsimo-Andrefana Region. The population of the commune was estimated to be approximately 31,000 in 2001 commune census.

Primary and junior level secondary education are available in town. The majority 60% of the population of the commune are farmers, while an additional 35% receives their livelihood from raising livestock. The most important crops are maize and cotton; also cassava is an important agricultural product. Services provide employment for 5% of the population.

== Geography ==
Andranovory is situated at the route nationale No. 7 (Tuléar-Fianarantsoa) at 70 km from Tuléar and 64 km from Sakaraha and its intersection with Route nationale 10.
