= Manalobe =

- Location in Madagascar
- Coordinates: 23°26′S 44°33′E
- Country: Madagascar
- Region: Atsimo-Andrefana
- District: Betioky Sud
- Elevation: 218 m (715 ft)

Population (2001)
  - Total: 4,000
- Time zone: UTC3 (EAT)

Manalobe is a town and commune (Malagasy: kaominina) in southwest Madagascar. It belongs to the district of Betioky Sud, which is a part of Atsimo-Andrefana Region. The population of the commune was estimated to be approximately 4,000 in 2001 commune census.

Only primary schooling is available. The majority 60% of the commune's population are farmers, while an additional 39% receive their livelihood from raising livestock. The most important crop is rice, while other important products are sugarcane and cassava. Services employ 1% of the population.
