= Arboretum d'Antsokay =

Botanical garden near Toliara, Madagascar

Coordinates: 23°24′52″S 43°45′20″E

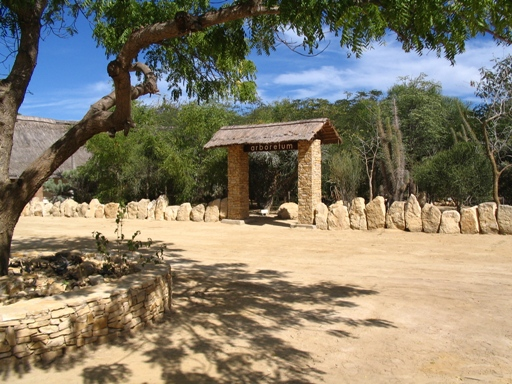
The Arboretum entrance in 2009

Arboretum d'Antsokay or Antsokay Arboretum is a botanical garden near the city of Toliara in Madagascar. About 900 plant species grow in the Arboretum, 90% of these endemic to Madagascar, 80% of them considered to have medicinal value and many threatened with extinction. Lonely Planet and Rough Guides both list the Arboretum as the top attraction in Toliara.

The Arboretum is located just off the RN7, about 12 km (7.5 mi) southeast of the city, and only 6 km (3.7 mi) from Toliara airport. It is open 7.30-17.30 and closed during the month of February.

There is an interpretation centre, a small museum (with rocks, fossils and an Aepyornis egg), a display of musical instruments and local crafts, a shop, a restaurant, as well as accommodation for visitors at Auberge de la Table. Guided tours are available in English.

Arboretum d'Antsokay collaborates on conservation projects with Royal Botanic Gardens Kew, the WWF, and the CEPF.

== Geography ==
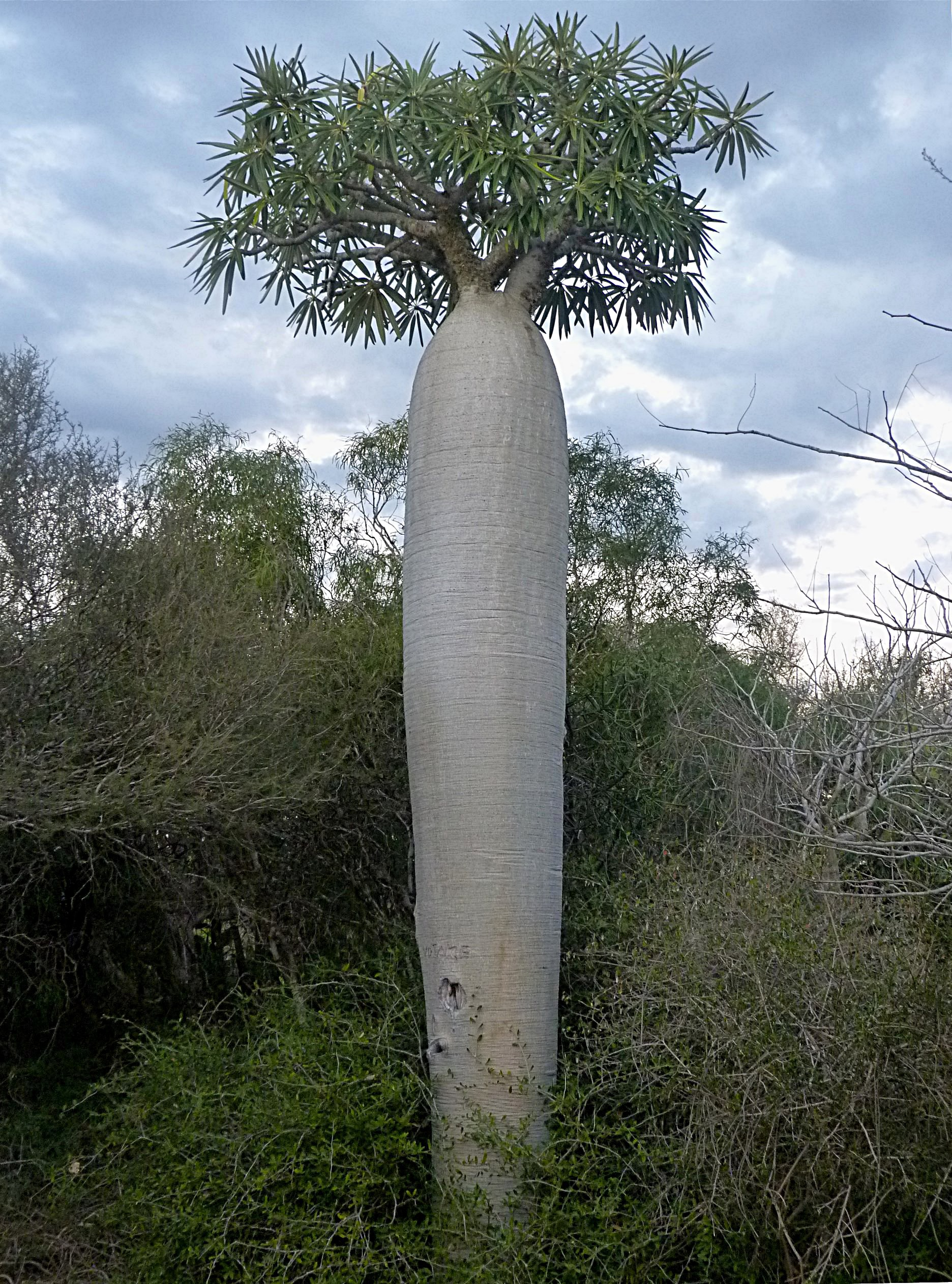
a Pachypodium at the Arboretum in 2012

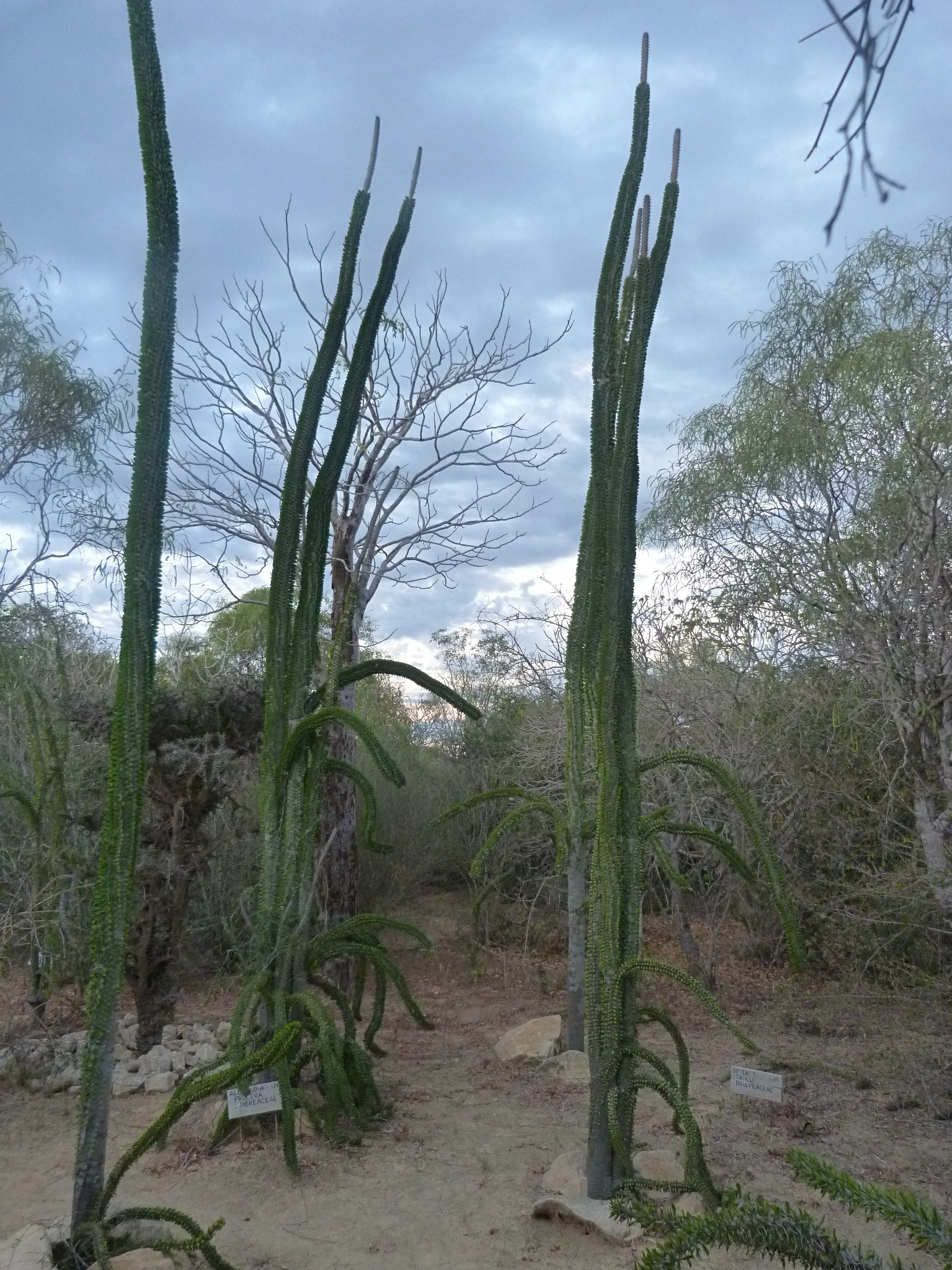
Didierea at the Arboretum in 2012

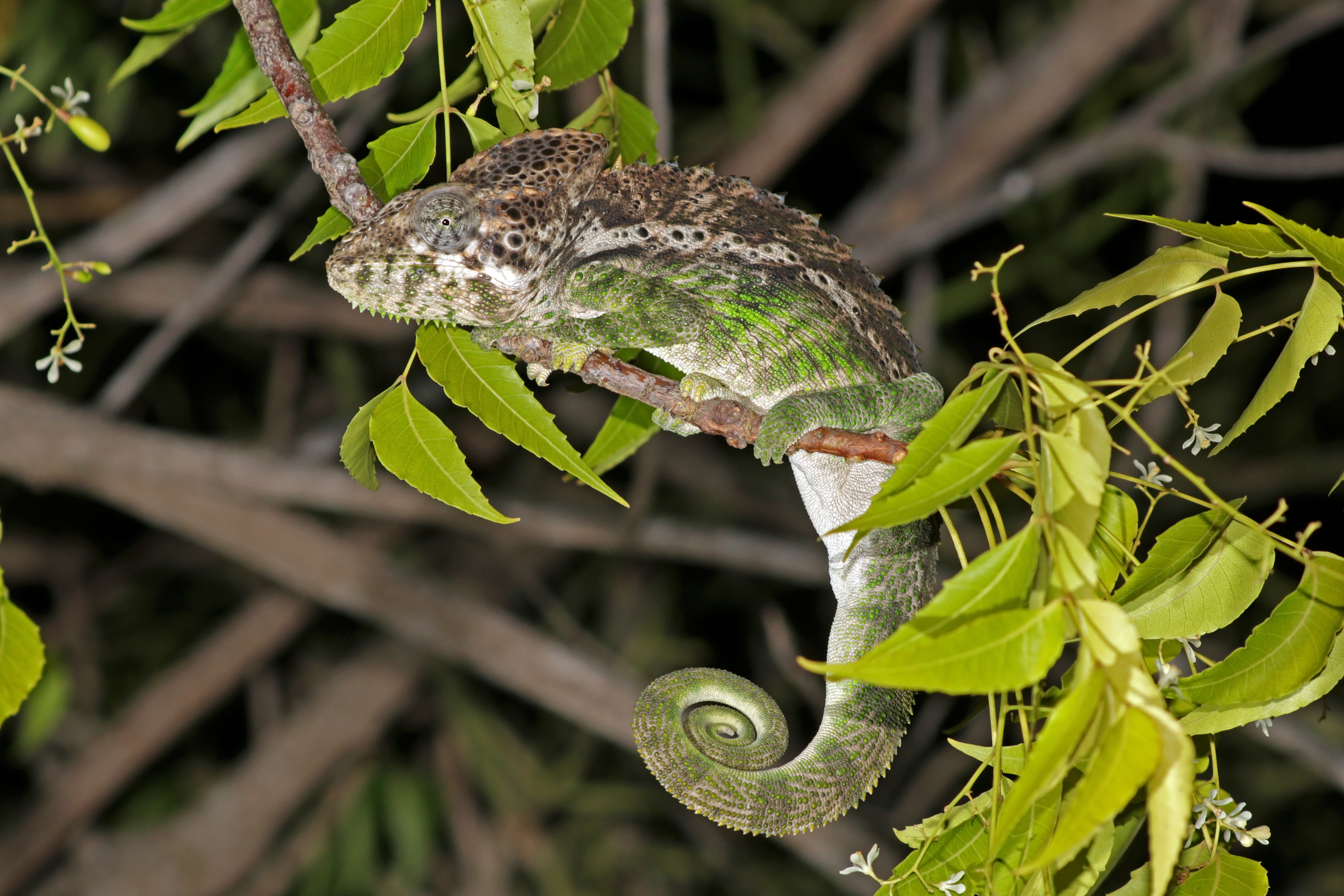
warty chameleon at the Arboretum in 2018

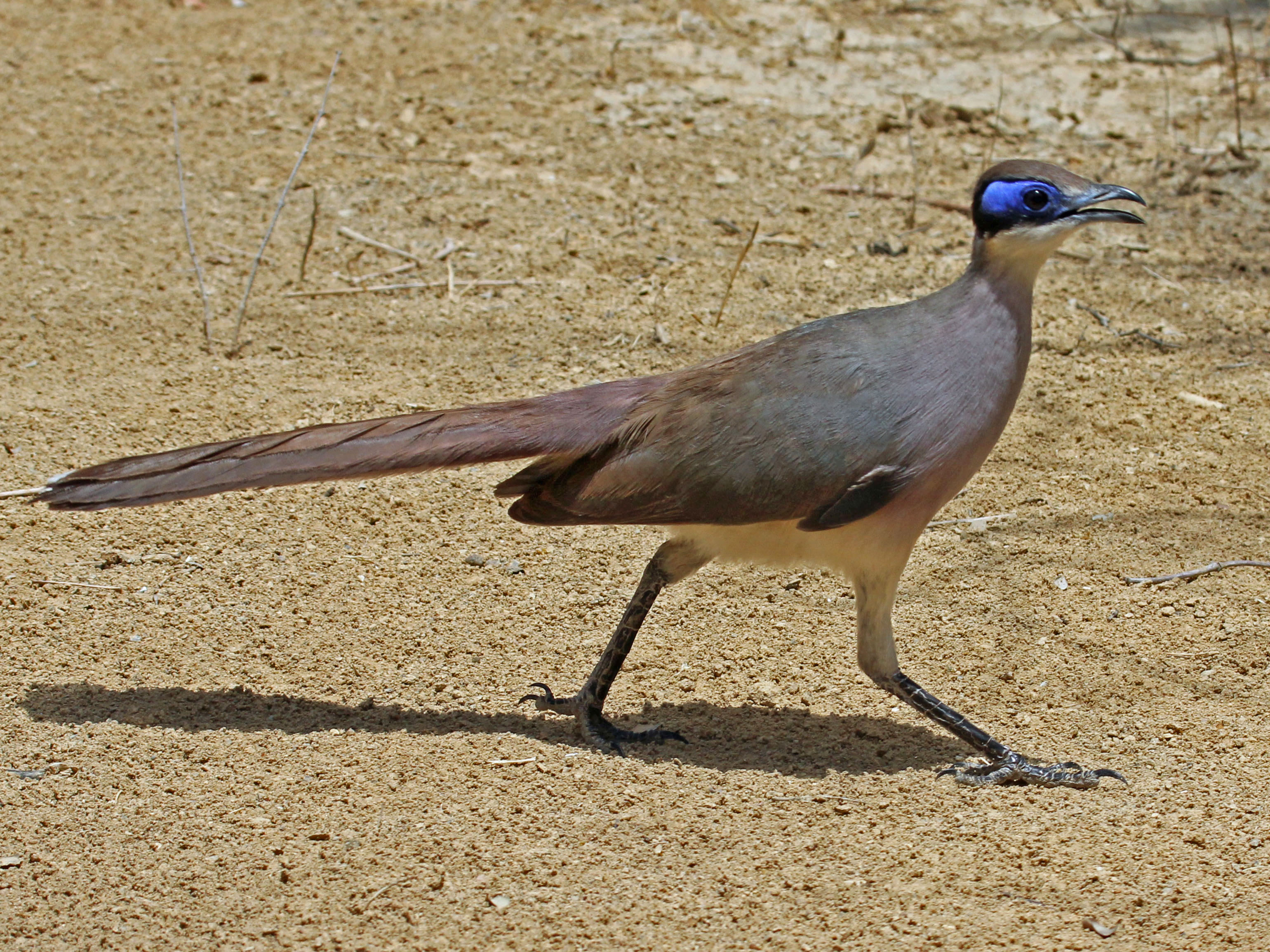
red-capped coua photographed at the Arboretum in 2013

Arboretum d'Antsokay is in the middle of an area of natural spiny forest, a desert habitat unique to Madagascar, and measures 400,000 square metres (4,300,000 sq ft). The geology is limestone and red low-calcium sand. Antsokaha is the name of the region, and means 'chalk' in Malagasy. It is 3 km (1.9 mi) from the western shore of Madagascar and the Mozambique Channel and close to a small mountain called La Table. It is 2 km (1.2 mi) north of the Tropic of Capricorn.

== Wildlife ==
Plants include Commiphora, baobab, Didierea madagascariensis, Kalanchoe, Pachypodium and Alluaudia procera.

Mouse lemurs live in the Arboretum. 34 species of birds and 25 species of reptile have also been sighted there. Birds include Coua ruficeps, Falco newtoni and Merops superciliosus. The Arboretum has played a role in conservation efforts to preserve the radiated tortoise, a very endangered species in the southern deserts.

== History ==
A Swiss botanist and conservationist, fr:Herman Petignat established the Arboretum in 1980. His son Andry has managed the arboretum since 2003.

According to Botanic Gardens Conservation International "On a surface of 40 hectares, surrounded by vegetal hedges, the project initiator exerted himself to have the most threatened plants species, reproduced and multiplied either by seeding, cutting or transplantation process in order to preserve most of them from constant deforestation, bush fire and looters."

Herman Petignat was assisted in discovering several plant species by Werner Rauh. These species were Euphorbia spinicapsula, Euphorbia kamponii, Euphorbia suzannae-marnierae and Aloe ruffingiana. Ceropegia petignatii and Cynanchum petignatii were named after Petignat by Rauh.
