= Mikea National Park =

National park in Madagascar

- IUCN category II (national park)
- Location within Madagascar
- Location: Ankililoaka, Atsimo-Andrefana, Madagascar
- Coordinates: 22°30′S 43°23′E
- Area: 2,367.37 km^{2} (914.05 sq mi)
- Designation: National park (proposed)
- Authorized: 2007
- Visitors: 0 (in 2006)
- Governing body: Madagascar National Parks Association

Mikea National Park is a national park in the Mikea Forest region of southwestern Madagascar, between Manombo and Morombe. It stretches over 120km from North to South between the Mangoky River and the Manombo river. It is situated west along the coast of National Road 9.

== See also ==
- Mikea Forest
