= Ampanihy =

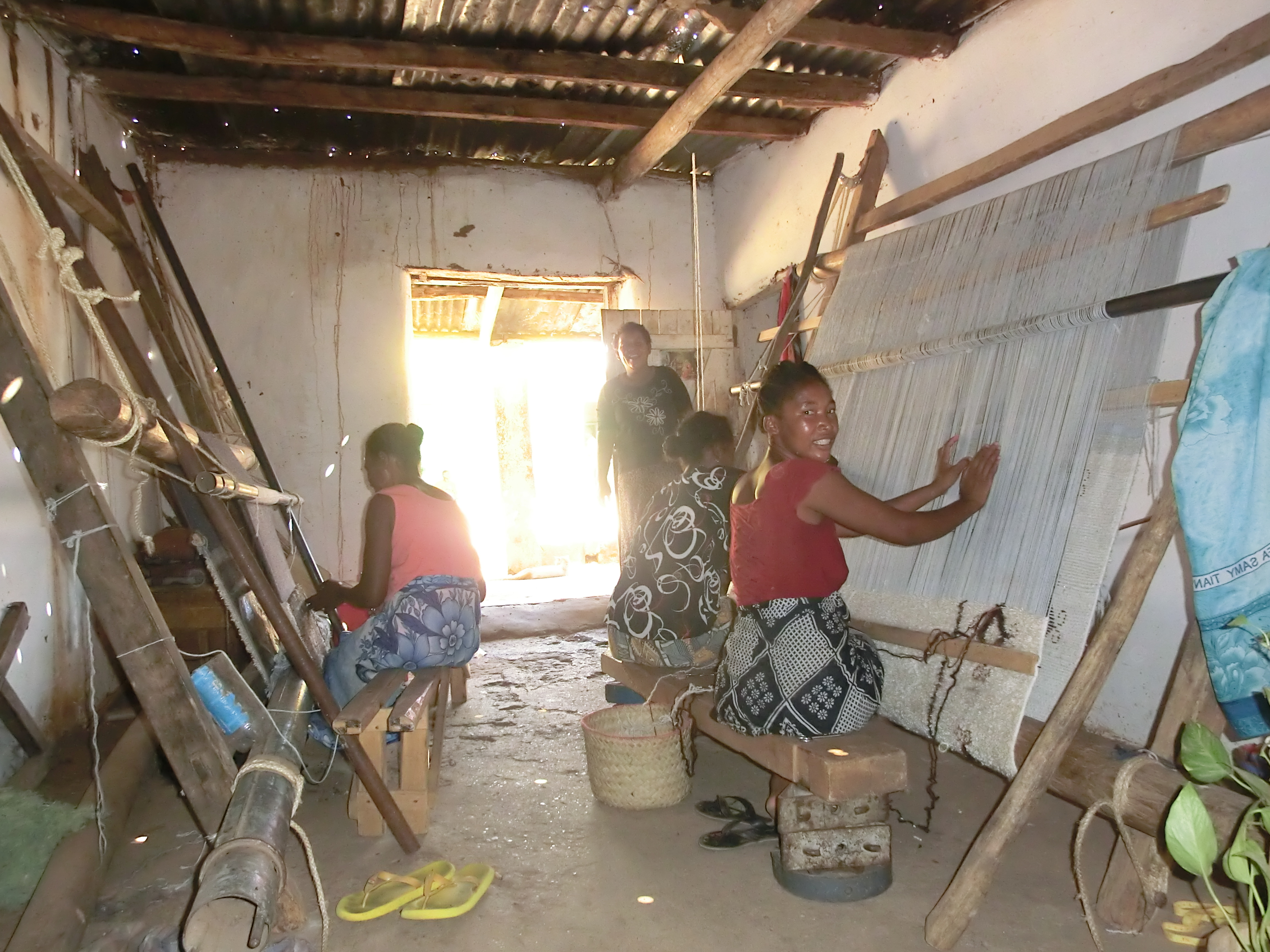
- Weaving women in Ampanihy

- Location in Madagascar
- Coordinates: 24°41′S 44°45′E
- Country: Madagascar
- Region: Atsimo-Andrefana
- District: Ampanihy Ouest (district)
- Elevation: 7 m (23 ft)

Population (2018)Census
  - Total: 52,053
  - Ethnicities: Mahafaly
- Time zone: UTC3 (EAT)
- Postal code: 605

Ampanihy or Ampanihy Ouest is a town in the Atsimo-Andrefana Region, Madagascar. It is home of the Ampanihy Airport and is crossed by the Route Nationale 10.

== Economy ==
The weaving of rugs from mohair is the most important economic activity since 1914.
