= Betioky Sud =

Betioky Sud Betioky-Atsimo
- Location in Madagascar
- Coordinates: 23°43′S 44°23′E
- Country: Madagascar
- Region: Atsinanana
- District: Betioky-Atsimo

Government
  - District Chef: Robert Rafaralahy

Population (2018)Census
  - Total: 25,612
- Time zone: UTC3 (EAT)

Betioky is a town in Atsimo-Andrefana Region, Madagascar and is crossed by the Route nationale 10. The population is 25,612 inhabitants in 2018.

An airport serves the town.

Betioky belongs to the poorest regions of Madagascar, where no facilities for tapped drinking water exist.

== Nature ==
The Beza Mahafaly Reserve lies approx. 35 km North-East of Betioky Sud in the municipality of Ankazombalala.

== Religion ==
- EEM - Eklesia Episkopaly Malagasy (Anglican Church of Madagascar)

== Mining ==
The Betioky mine, an iron ore deposit than is not yet exploited.
