= Beza Mahafaly Special Reserve =

- IUCN category IV (habitat/species management area)
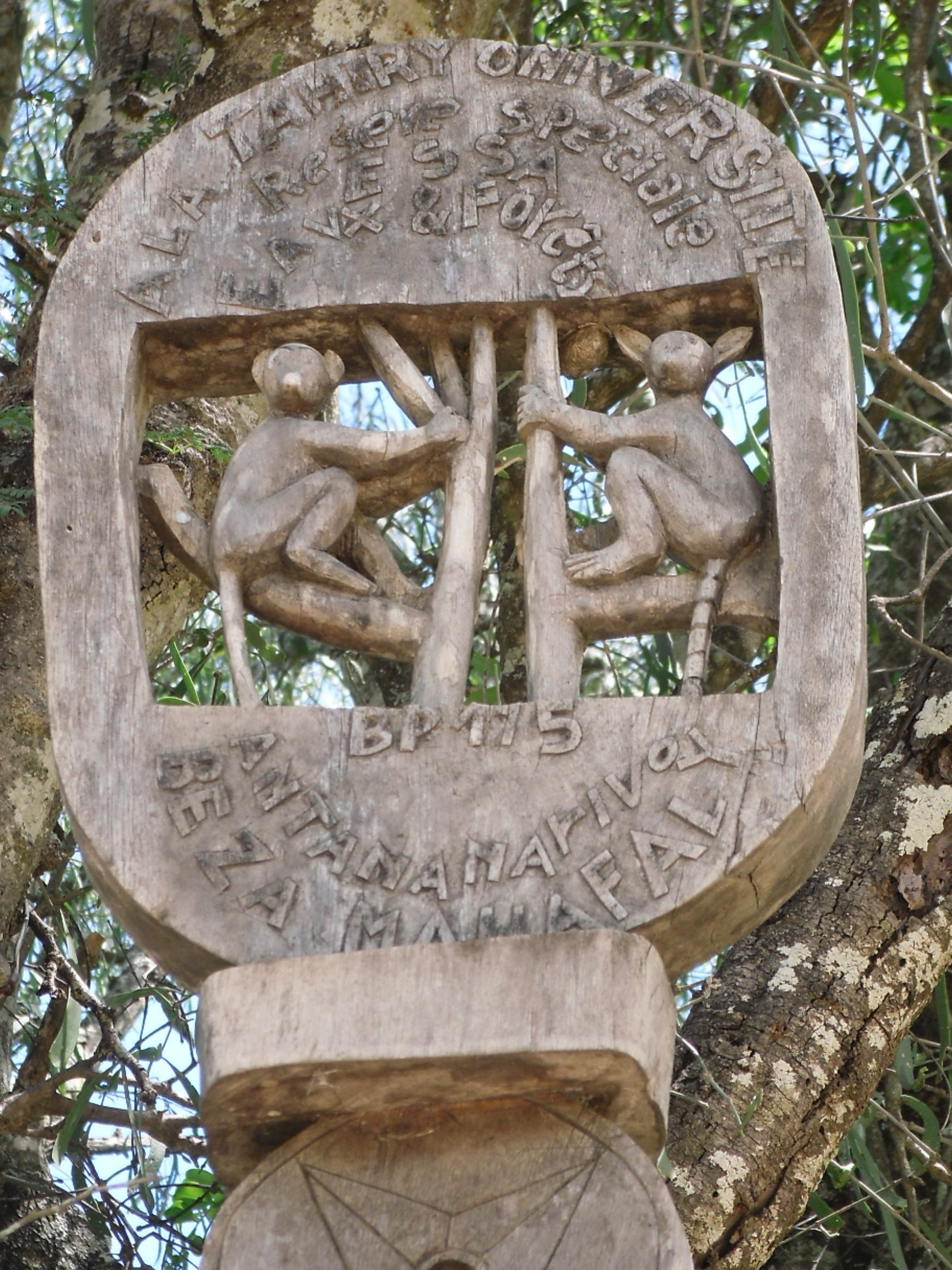

- Location within Madagascar
- Location: Southwest Madagascar
- Nearest city: Betioky-Atsimo , Toliara
- Coordinates: 23°40′S 44°36′E
- Area: 1,433 acres (5.80 km^{2})
- Established: 1978
- Governing body: Parcs Nationaux Madagascar -ANGAP

The Beza Mahafaly Special Reserve is a nature reserve in Madagascar 35 kilometres (22 mi) northeast of Betioky Sud. The reserve also provides training and research opportunities. It consists of a fenced gallery forest, approximately 100 hectares (250 acres), separated by 8 kilometres (5 mi) from a 520-hectare (1,300-acre) gallery of arid spiny forest. The reserve has a museum that is open to tourists.

Tree species featured in the two galleries include tamarind trees and Madagascar ocotillo, among many others. Animals residing in the galleries include four species of lemurs, four species of tenrecs, 17 species of saurians, 12 species of snakes, two species of tortoises and, in season, the Nile crocodile. There are over 100 species of birds.

== Geography ==
The reserve is situated at 35 km North East of Betioky-Atsimo on the right side of the Onilahy River.

== History ==
The Reserve was founded in 1975, when community leaders formed a partnership with the University of Madagascar (now University of Antananarivo), Washington University in St. Louis, and Yale University aiming to protect the forest. It has been a centre for research and education since 1978, and the Bezà Mahafaly Monitoring Team of local researchers began work in 1995.

== Research ==
International researchers, supported by the Monitoring Team, maintain long-term studies of the reserve's wildlife. For example, Verreaux's sifaka and the ring-tailed lemur have been the subjects of collaborative research by Malagasy and US researchers for over 25 years. During this period, hundreds of specimens have been observed in the field, with individual tagging, anatomical measurement, and genetic and hormone sampling helping researchers to understand their behavior, physiology, mating strategies, and demography.

In addition to collecting systematic data on climatic conditions, the Monitoring Team seeks to gather information about the human community living near the reserve: who they are, how they live, and what are their attitudes toward the reserve.

== Education and training ==
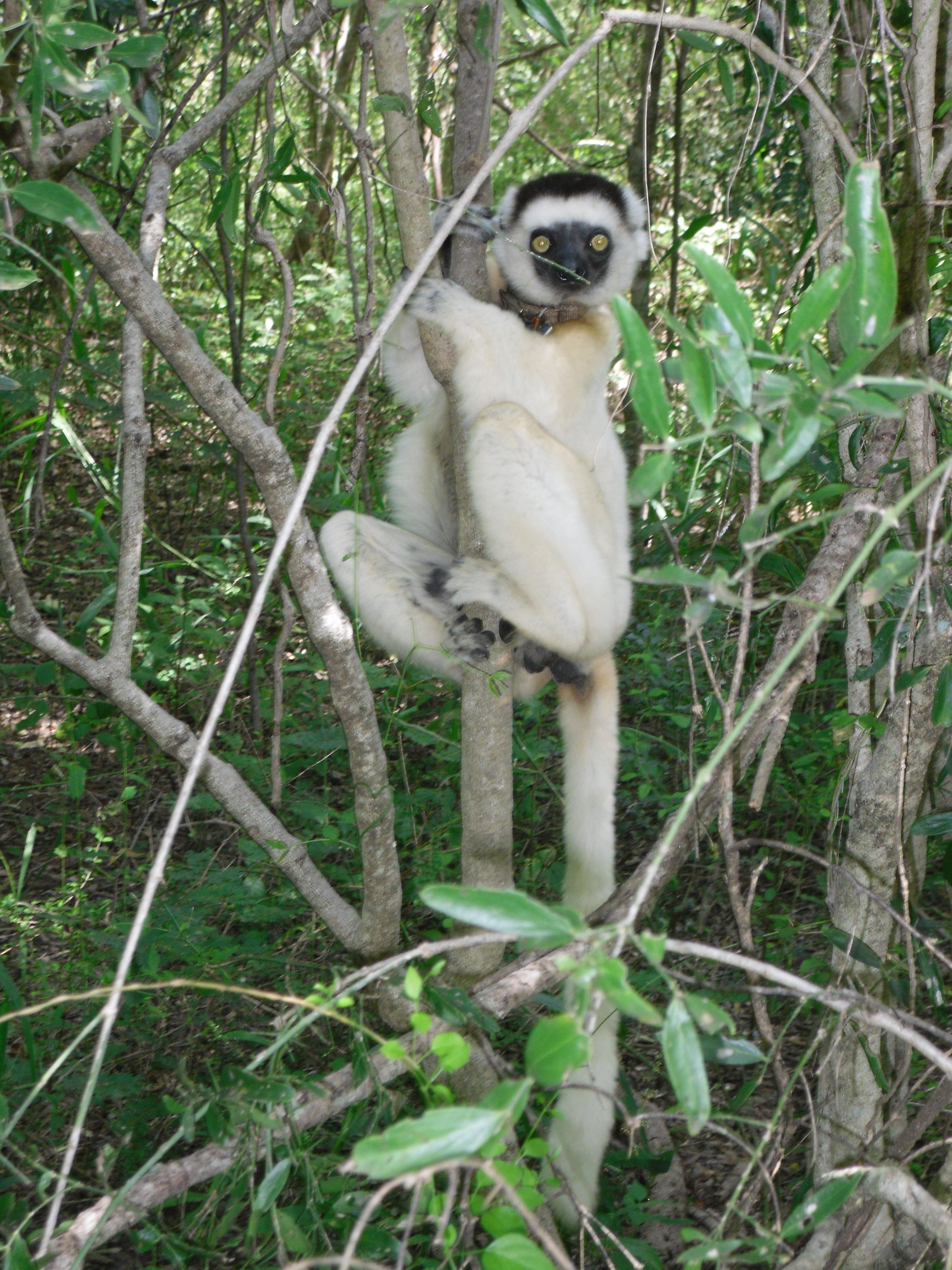
Verreaux's sifaka (Propithecus verreauxi).

Beza Mahafaly hosts an annual field school run by ESSA-Forêts, where 15-20 fifth-year students gain practical experience of conservation techniques in a 10-day course. The students undertake a combination of seminars, fieldwork, and independent projects. Field-based courses are offered to student groups from international institutions.

Other group workshops, outreach events, and training courses targeted at local school children, adults living in nearby, university students, teachers, and government officials take place each year.

List of lemur species found in Beza-Mahafaly Reserve
Viewing time	Species
Day	Ring-tailed lemur (Lemur catta); Verreaux's sifaka (Propithecus verreauxi)
Night	White-footed sportive lemur (Lepilemur leucopus); Reddish-gray mouse lemur (Microcebus griseorufus)

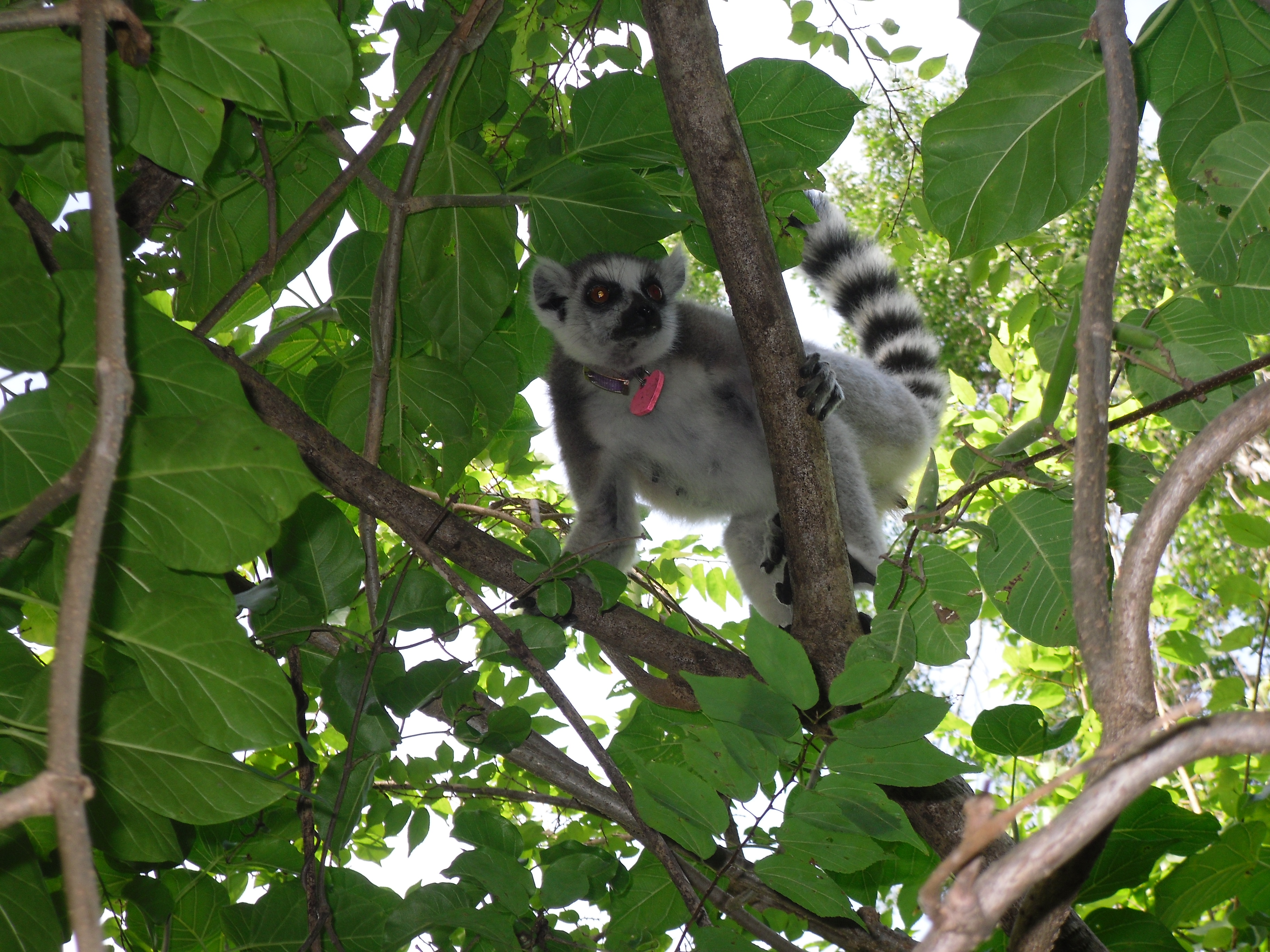
Ring-tailed lemur (Lemur catta).

== See also ==
- List of national parks of Madagascar
