= Toliara =

Toliara Tuléar Toliary
- Location of Toliara in Madagascar
- Coordinates: 23°21′S 43°40′E
- Country: Madagascar
- Region: Atsimo-Andrefana

Government
  - Prefect: Lydore Solondraza

Area
  - Total: 32.1 km^{2} (12.4 sq mi)

Population (2018 census)
  - Total: 168,756
  - Density: 5,260/km^{2} (13,600/sq mi)
- Postal code: 601

Toliara (also known as Toliary, [tuliˈarʲ]; formerly Tuléar) is a city in southern Madagascar. It is the capital of the Atsimo-Andrefana region, located 936 km southwest of the national capital Antananarivo.

The current spelling of the name was adopted in the 1970s, reflecting the orthography of the Malagasy language. Many geographic place names, assigned French spellings during the colonial period, were altered following Malagasy independence in 1960.

The city has a population of 168,758 in 2018. As a port town it acts as a major import/export hub for commodities such as sisal, soap, hemp, cotton, rice and peanuts.

== History ==
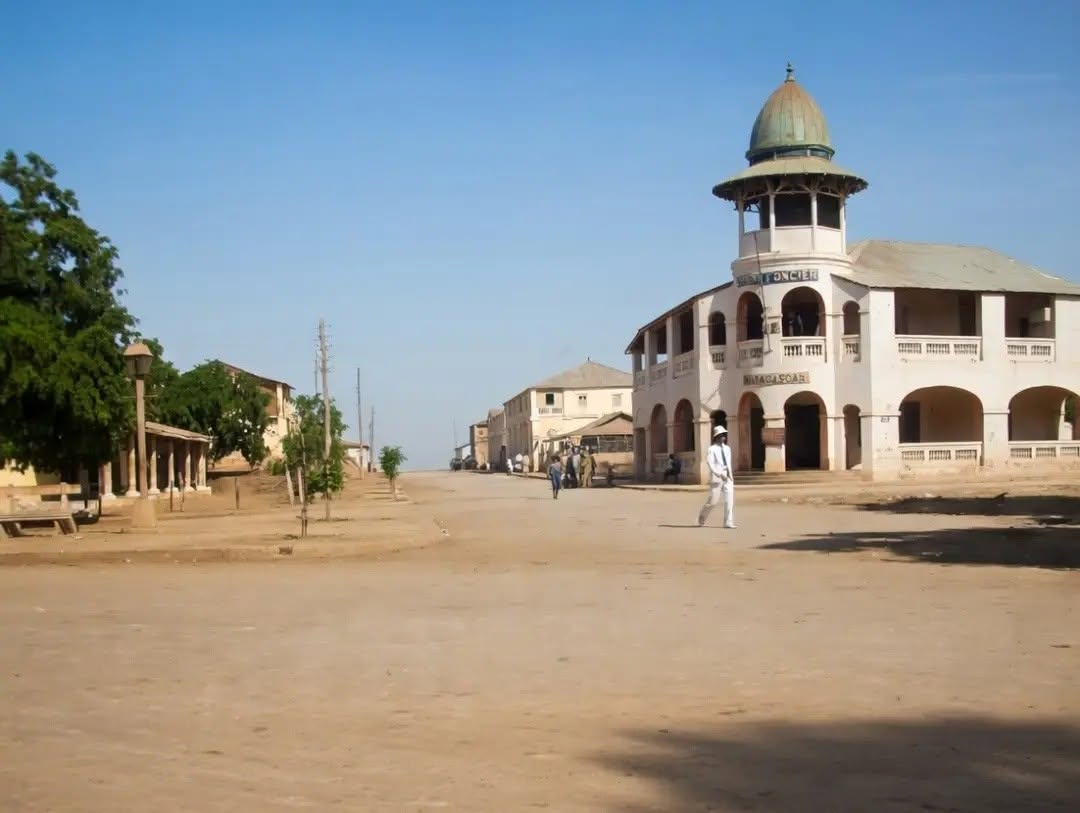
Toliara in 1934

In the 17th century, French buccaneers landed in the bay of St. Augustine near the Tropic of Capricorn, and founded the city to maintain commercial relations. It was not until the colonial period, after 1897, when the city really grew: with the efforts of Joseph Gallieni to install French administrative services, previously isolated on the island of Nosy Ve, to form the regional capital. Tulear grew along a grid pattern of cross streets, with wide avenues and public monuments.

Toliara is also where the dog breed Coton de Tulear originates from.

== Population ==
Toliara has seen a population boom over the last two decades, due to a rural exodus that has brought over 200,000 citizens into urban centers in the region.

The Vezo, nomadic fishermen, are the indigenous ethnic group. Today they are being dominated by migrants from the South (Mahafale, Masikoro, Antandroy) which make up more than half of the urban population. To these are added migrants from other urban regions, occupying positions in government and the private sector.

=== Religion ===
Toliara's cathedral is the archiepiscopal seat of the Roman Catholic Archdiocese of Toliara, one of five in the country, originally the Diocese of Tuléar since 1957, renamed with the city in 1989, promoted in 2003 to Metropolitan archbishopric.

== Culture and sights ==
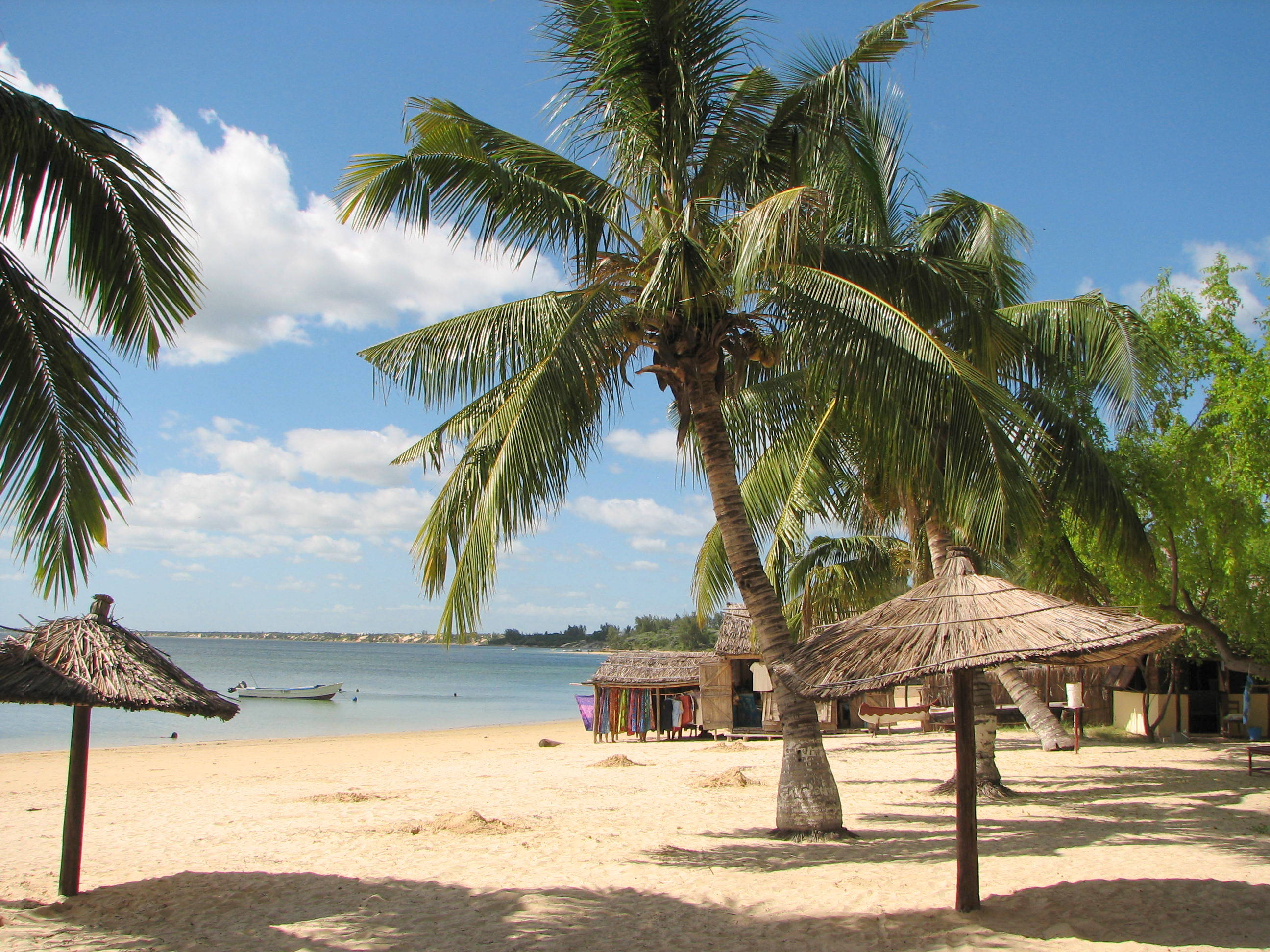
Ifaty beach near Toliara

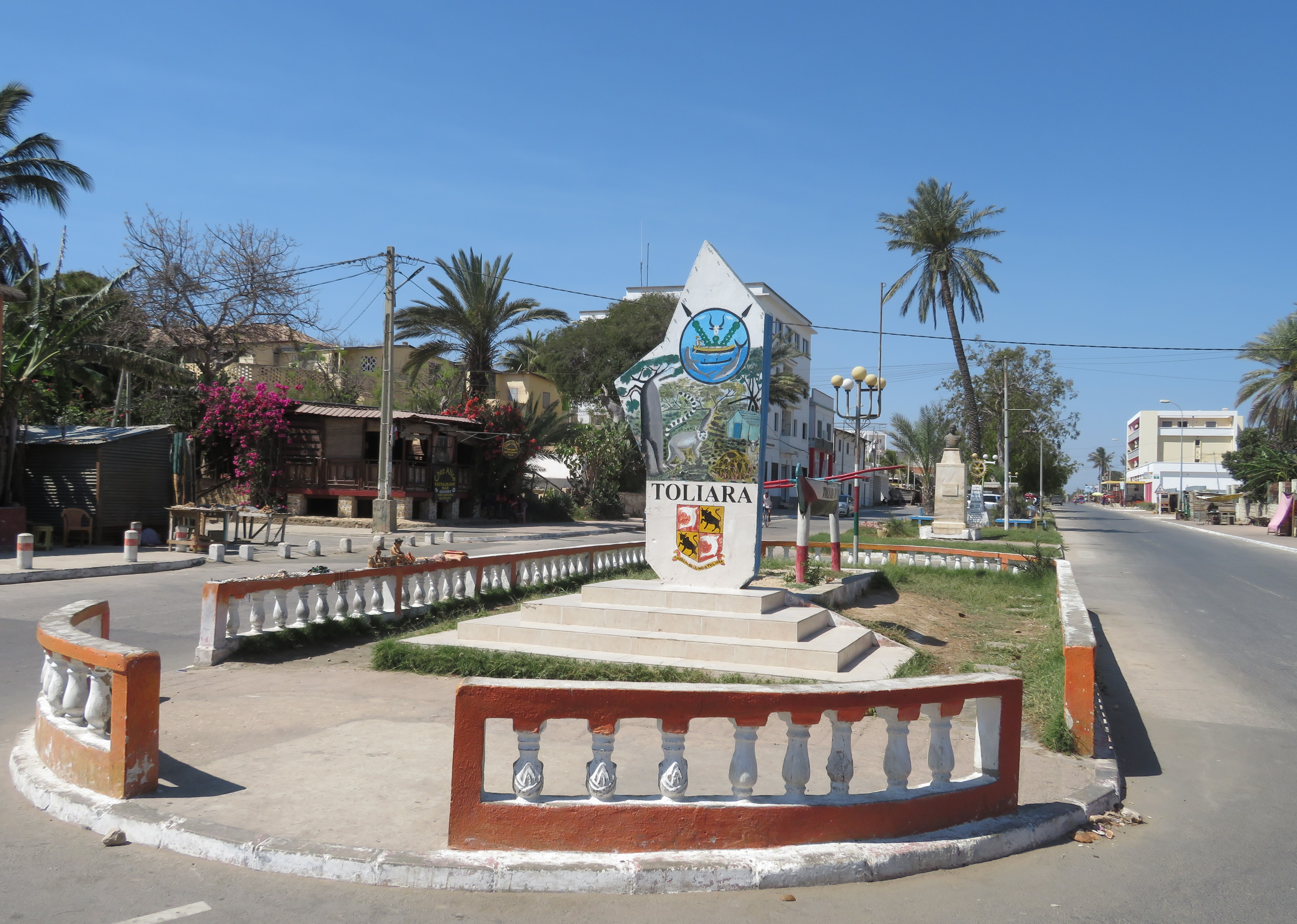
Boulevard Galliéni with the arms of Toliara

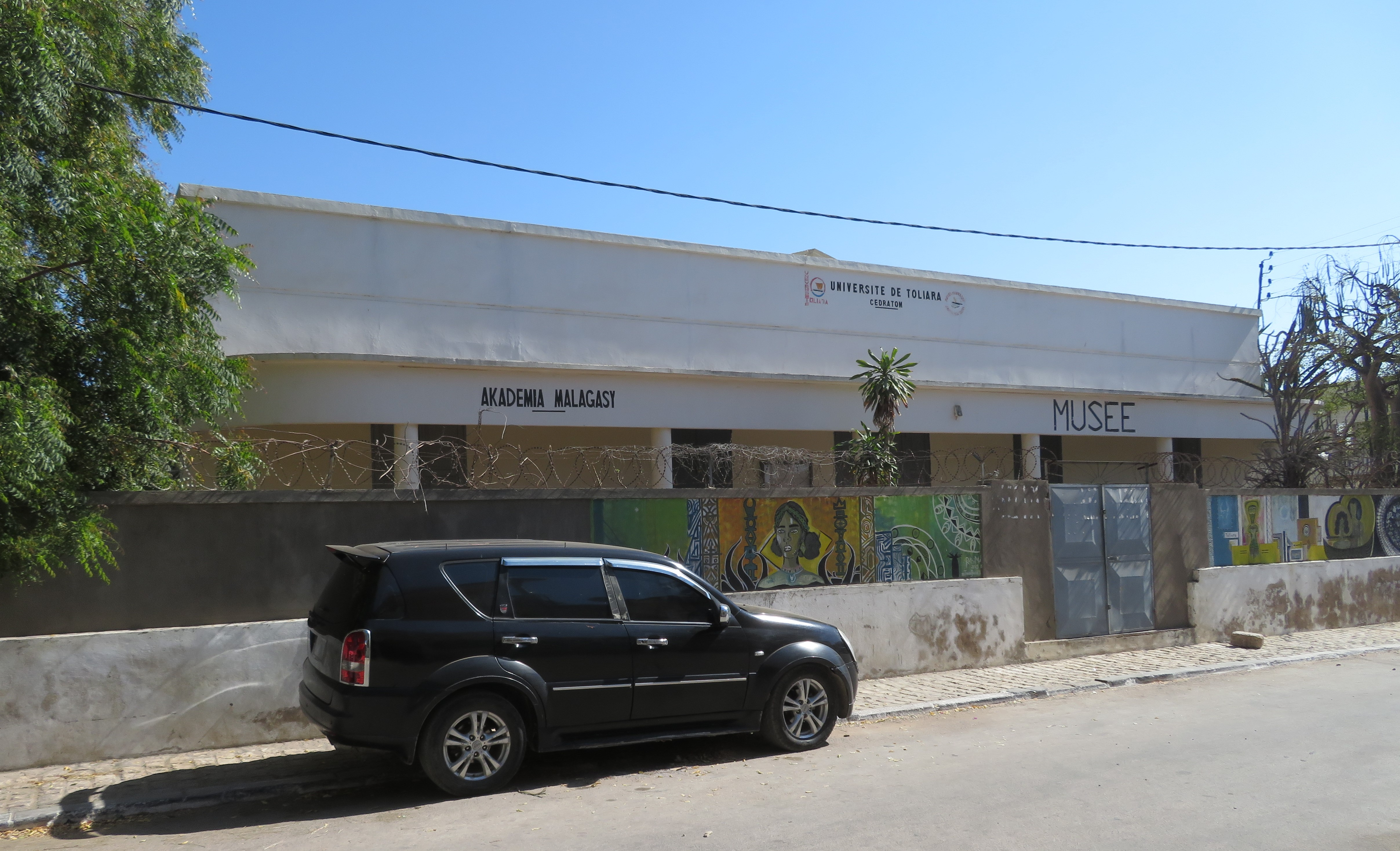
Cedratom Museum

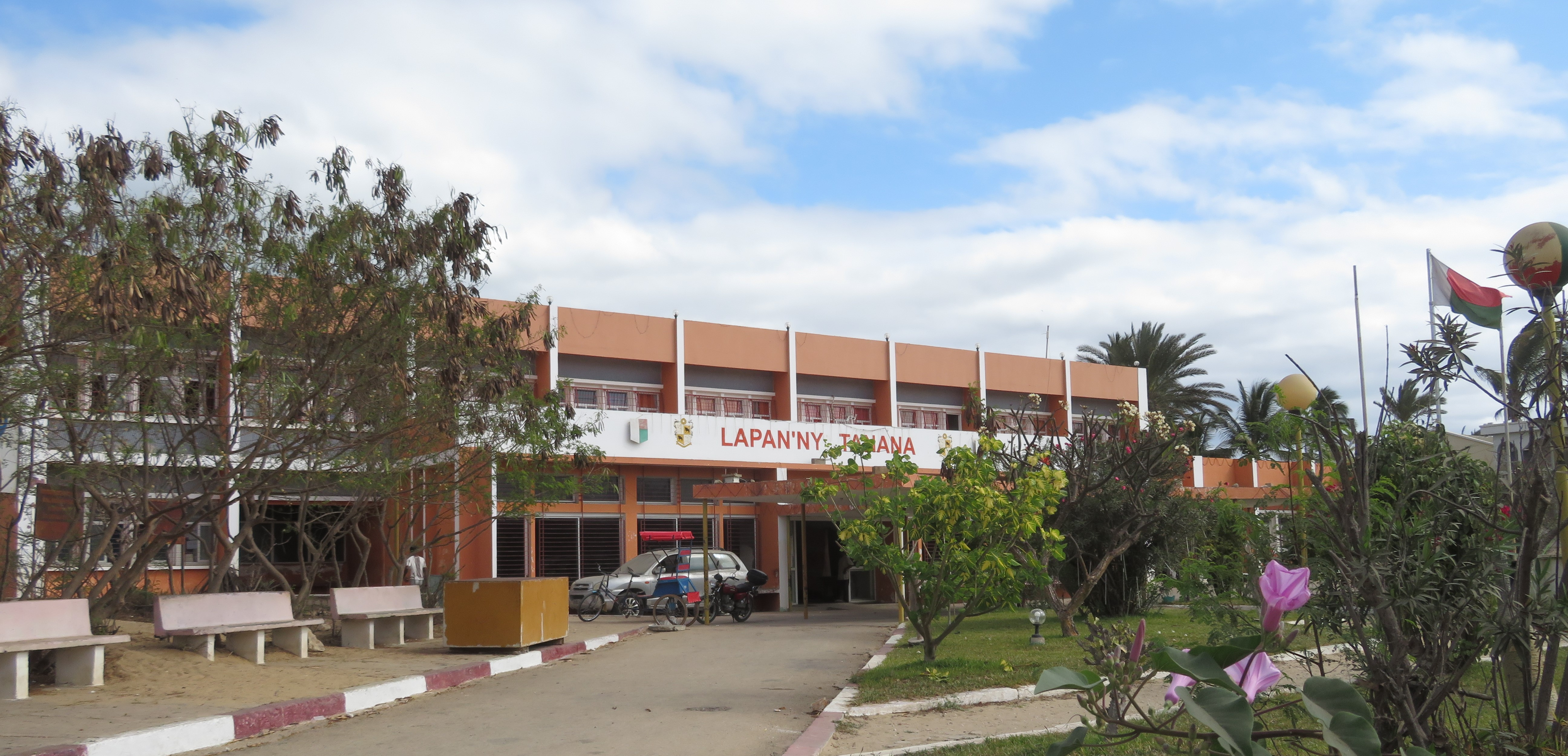
City Hall

Regional cultural highlights include:

- The Ifaty beach near Tulear is famous for its water and sands.
- The Museum of Arts and Traditions of the South of Madagascar (in Cedratom) presents the life, crafts and funerary art of the people in the area.
- The Recycling Museum (Musée du recyclage) is an art gallery dedicated to art made from recycled materials.
- The Regional Museum of the University of Toliara: this museum has a small ethnological collection and a huge egg of Aepyornis.
- The Museum of the Sea, founded by Professor Rabesandratana, is hosted by the Oceanographic Institute and covers the local aquatic flora and fauna, including a coelacanth caught in 1995 near Anakao.
- Boulevard Galliéni, the most representative street of Toliara, with several monuments, Main Post Office, Institute of Pedagogics, City Hall, various banks, shops and restaurants. One of the most important monuments is dedicated to Monja Jaona, a politician and former mayor ofToliara.
- Cathédrale Saint Vincent de Paul, a Roman Catholic cathedral, is the centre of the Roman Catholic Archdiocese of Toliara.
- Katedraly Loterana, a protestant cathedral with two towers.
- Fiangonana Rasalama Maritiora is a modern protestant church named after Rafaravavy Rasalama (1810–1837), the first christian martyr of Madagascar.
- The Antsokay Arboretum: Established in 1980 at the initiative of the Swiss amateur botanist Petignat Hermann (1923–2000). This arboretum covers an area of 52 hectares, with more than 920 plant species, lemurs, radiated tortoises, snakes and chameleons.
- A locally known shell market, on the waterfront, behind the French Alliance, sells shells and various handicraft products. It is also known for the breeding of the dog Coton de Telear

=== Education ===
The University of Toliara is historically the oldest center for higher education, founded in 1971 after the decentralization of the University of Madagascar center. The university campus is located in Maninday 5 km east of the city, and teaches Humanities and Social Science, Science, Philosophy, and Management.

The Fisheries and Marine Sciences Institute (IHSM) welcomes students from diverse backgrounds, and offers advanced training in fisheries, aquaculture, and the marine and coastal environment.

Toliara has a Technical School and two grammar schools (Lycée Laurent Botokeky and Antaninarenina High School), private and religious schools such as Sacred Heart College, Tsianaloke Mahavatse, and the School of Notre Dame, and a French international school, Collège Etienne de Flacourt, which serves école primaire (primary school) and collège.

=== Slogans ===
- Fiherena no maha-Toliara, "the Fiherenana River is the soul of Toliara"
- Toliara tsy miroro, "Toliara never sleeps"

== Economy and production ==
The port played a key role during the "boom corn" years in the 1980s and 90s. Today, the arrival of migrants contributing to agricultural production (maize, cassava and rice) and livestock (cattle and goats) supplying the city markets with food, has contributed to the development of small informal businesses: particularly among the Mahafale and Masikoro communities. The city specializes in the import and export of various products including sisal, cotton, rice, peanuts and soap. Production of sea salt thrives, from salt marshes and landscaped places in coastal areas.

The Bay of Toliara houses one of Madagascar's oil exploration sites. The sea floor is rich in minerals gemstones (about 200 km to the north lies the Ilakaka sapphire deposit has operated since 1999) and ground salt. More recently, Canadian companies begin operation of the ilmenite in the region of Tolanaro. Beyond this mining and production, the industrial sector has declined in recent decades.

Tourism is a promising sector, thanks to the climate and natural assets of the hinterland (Ifaty, Anakao, Saint Augustin). Calm shallow seas and shallow support scuba diving, and Toliara remains a main destination for tours to southern Madagascar.

The Toliara Sands project, renamed Base Toliara, seeks to exploit ilmenite but encounters strong opposition despite an investment of 700 million dollars.

== Geography and climate ==
Toliara is located on a broad coastal plain, surrounded by dunes and mangroves, near the Tropic of Capricorn in the Mozambique Channel. A nearby barrier reef (the Great Reef) is 18 km long and 3 km wide. The beach area is extended by an underwater beach along the continental shelf that slopes gently seaward. To the north lies the Delta Fiherenana.

Toliara is nicknamed the "City of the Sun" because it has a hot climate (25.3 °C average) which is arid (Köppen BWh), with less than 400 mm annual rainfall. The city is constantly swept by a strong prevailing wind, the Tsio Katimo ("South Wind").

Climate data for Toliara (1991–2020, extremes 1951–present)
Month	Jan	Feb	Mar	Apr	May	Jun	Jul	Aug	Sep	Oct	Nov	Dec	Year
Record high °C (°F)	42.3 (108.1)	39.0 (102.2)	39.7 (103.5)	38.5 (101.3)	37.4 (99.3)	35.7 (96.3)	35.0 (95.0)	37.5 (99.5)	38.0 (100.4)	39.5 (103.1)	38.0 (100.4)	39.0 (102.2)	42.3 (108.1)
Mean daily maximum °C (°F)	32.9 (91.2)	32.9 (91.2)	32.8 (91.0)	31.6 (88.9)	29.8 (85.6)	28.2 (82.8)	27.8 (82.0)	28.5 (83.3)	29.7 (85.5)	30.7 (87.3)	31.8 (89.2)	32.4 (90.3)	30.8 (87.4)
Daily mean °C (°F)	28.3 (82.9)	28.3 (82.9)	27.8 (82.0)	26.1 (79.0)	23.9 (75.0)	22.1 (71.8)	21.5 (70.7)	22.3 (72.1)	23.5 (74.3)	25.2 (77.4)	26.7 (80.1)	27.8 (82.0)	25.3 (77.5)
Mean daily minimum °C (°F)	23.7 (74.7)	23.6 (74.5)	22.8 (73.0)	20.6 (69.1)	17.9 (64.2)	15.9 (60.6)	15.1 (59.2)	15.9 (60.6)	17.3 (63.1)	19.7 (67.5)	21.6 (70.9)	23.1 (73.6)	19.8 (67.6)
Record low °C (°F)	14.6 (58.3)	15.0 (59.0)	16.8 (62.2)	10.0 (50.0)	10.2 (50.4)	9.8 (49.6)	8.6 (47.5)	10.0 (50.0)	10.5 (50.9)	11.8 (53.2)	14.0 (57.2)	17.0 (62.6)	8.6 (47.5)
Average precipitation mm (inches)	126.5 (4.98)	89.8 (3.54)	41.4 (1.63)	10.1 (0.40)	12.5 (0.49)	7.6 (0.30)	4.3 (0.17)	3.7 (0.15)	4.7 (0.19)	8.8 (0.35)	14.8 (0.58)	35.3 (1.39)	359.5 (14.17)
Average precipitation days (≥ 1.0 mm)	7.2	6.2	3.3	1.2	1.4	1.2	0.8	0.7	0.7	1.1	1.9	3.9	29.6
Average relative humidity (%)	77	77	75	76	75	74	74	72	74	75	75	77	75
Mean monthly sunshine hours	310.7	271.9	299.9	289.4	296.4	282.5	295.3	315.4	304.4	314.3	316.2	300.6	3,597
Source 1: NOAA (sun, 1961-1990)
Source 2: Deutscher Wetterdienst (humidity, 1951–1980), Meteo Climat (record highs and lows)

== Infrastructure ==
The colonial legacy is still visible in the architecture and the urban landscape. Major road works and development were undertaken in 2003 to promote the development of the city.

The University Hospital Centre CHU Mitsinjo Betanimena is located near the city center in the district of Tanambao. Another private health facility, St. Luke's Clinic, is located in the district of Sanfily on the road to the airport.

=== Transport ===
Toliara Airport is located in the city. Air Madagascar operates scheduled flights to here.

== Sports ==
- 3FB Toliara (football)
- JFC Toliara (football)
- AS Comato (football)

== See also ==
- Isalo National Park
- Beza Mahafaly Reserve
- Coton de Tulear
