= Mahafaly =

Ethnic group of Madagascar

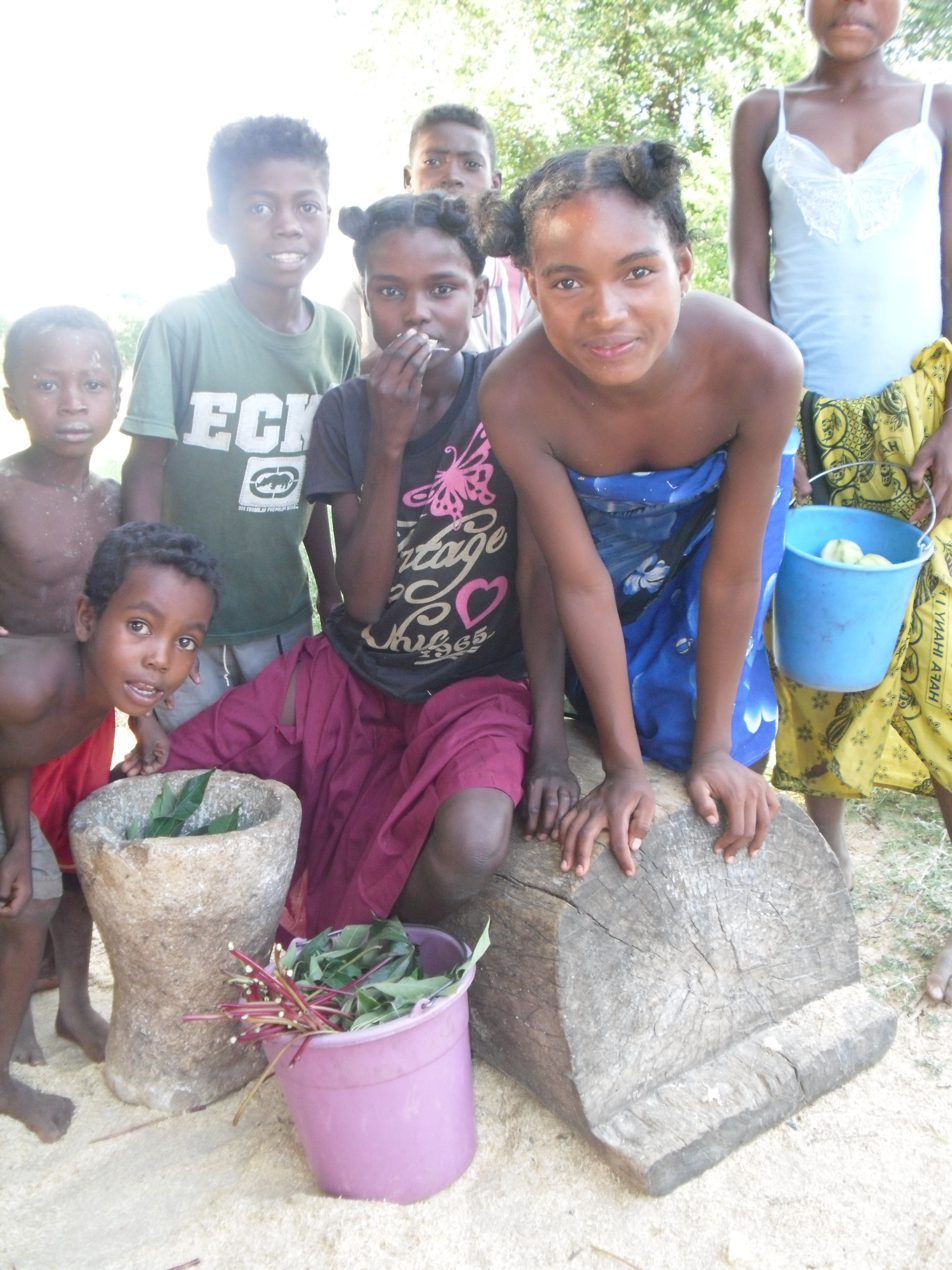
- Mahafaly children

Total population
- c. 150,000 (2013)

Regions with significant populations
- Madagascar

Languages
- Mahafaly

Religion
- Christianity and traditional religion

Related ethnic groups
- Other Malagasy groups; Bantu peoples, Austronesian peoples

The Mahafaly are an ethnic group of Madagascar that inhabit the plains of the Betioky-Ampanihy area. Their name means either "those who make holy" or "those who make happy", although the former is considered more likely by linguists. In 2013 there were an estimated 150,000 Mahafaly in Madagascar. The Mahafaly are believed to have arrived in Madagascar from southeastern Africa around the 12th century. They became known for the large tombs they build to honor dead chiefs and kings. Mainly involved in farming and cattle raising, they speak a dialect of the Malagasy language, which is a branch of the Malayo-Polynesian language group.

== Ethnic identity ==
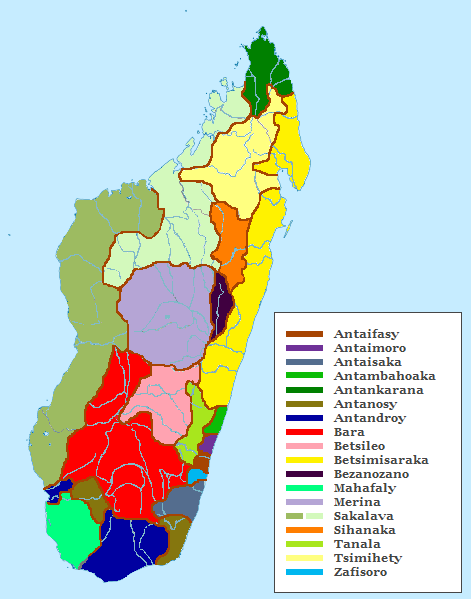
Distribution of Malagasy ethnic groups

This ethnic group label has been used by other Malagasy and foreigners to describe the people who traditionally inhabited the southwestern coast of Madagascar, bounded inland by the Menarandra and Onilahy rivers. The people themselves do not use this label or identify as part of a single ethnic group, however, and prefer to identify along other kinship or geopolitical lines; the name Mahafaly holds no meaning for the people originating from this area and instead is a label imposed from the outside. The majority of the population is concentrated along the banks of the rivers that run through the otherwise largely arid territory.

== History ==
According to oral histories, the Mahafaly people trace their origins back to an early Maroserana noble, Olembetsitoto, who emerged as a leader in the 1500s. Prior to this, people settled in this portion of the island lived in communities ruled by chiefly families called andriantsileliky. The Maroserana initially formed alliances with these families, but this eventually turned to conflict, with the Maroserana emerging as the victors; as the Maroserana came to power, they allowed the Andriantileliky to retain certain privileges and special status.

After reigning for some years, Olembetsitoto went into seclusion. His followers believed that he had become holy (faly) and made his land and people holy (maha-faly) through this act, which mirrored popular belief around the principal Maroserana deity Andriamaro, which could not be seen, communicated through a medium intermediary, and commanded obedience by inspiring fear and awe. The followers of this noble remained united in their allegiance to him through the ombiasy (holy adviser) who served as an intermediary between the ruler and his people. One of the earliest documented Mahafaly political actions was in June 1649, when twelve Mahafaly envoys visited the French settlement at Fort Dauphin to successfully obtain the paid services of French mercenaries to help fight the Masikoro people who had stolen their king's cattle.

The Mahafaly polity began to splinter into independent kingdoms beginning around 1650 with the Sakatovo and Menarandra kingdoms. The Linta kingdom split away around two decades later, and the Onilahy kingdom was formed from the remaining territory around 1750. A conflict between the king of Menarandra and the neighboring Antandroy people to the west resulted in the annexation of the Antandroy province of Karimbola in the first half of the 18th century. Although the specifics of the history of these kingdoms before 1800 is not well known, the frequent changes in rulers within each kingdom points to instability and turmoil within the Maroserana dynasty: Linta had seven rulers, Sakatovo had six, Menarandra had three between 1750 and 1800, and Onilahy had two. The Onilahy kingdom reflected some Antemoro influences, such as calling their king by the title andrianony.

The Mahafaly kingdom was one of the few that did not come under the control of the Merina Kingdom in the 19th century. The last Mahafaly king was Tsiampondy, who began ruling in 1890. According to the General History of Africa, Tsiampondy's reign ended in 1911, while according to a French document named Observations sur les Mahafalys, Tsiampondy's reign ended after a short French military campaign in 1907.

== Society ==
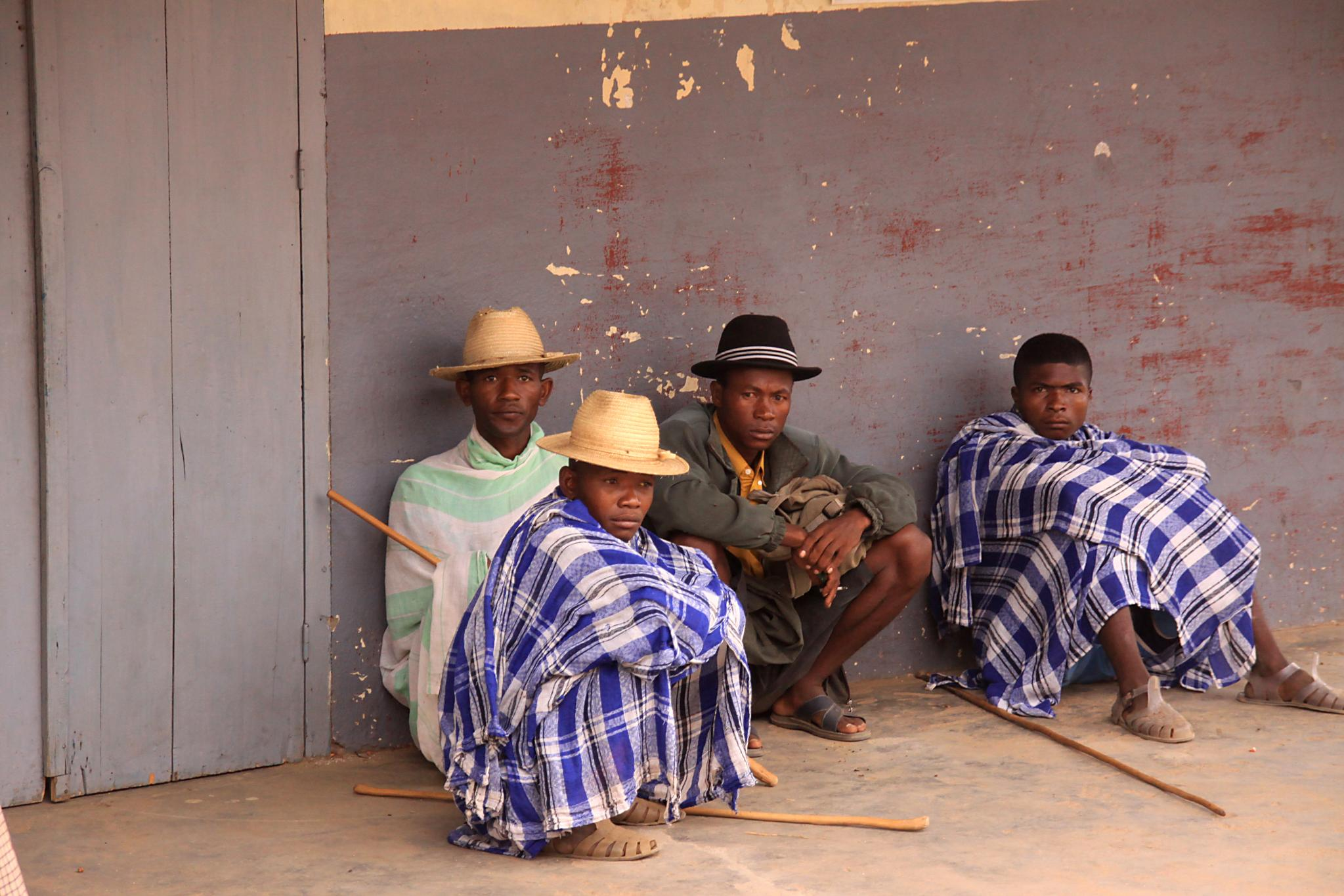
Mahafaly men

Mahafaly society is generally patriarchal. It is expected that male family members (fathers, sons, brothers) should live in close proximity to one another, while women are expected to move to their husband's village. Society is primarily structured around five types of kinship groups, with the immediate household as the most important. As in other parts of Madagascar, ancestors are venerated.

Historically, beginning with the first Maroserana ruler, the Mahafaly were ruled by kings of the Maroserana line. Kings were buried in tombs called volamena ("gold") and they were renamed after their death, a practice called anaratahina, as it was taboo after death to speak the name a king had in life; all his followers were required to cut their hair at the start of the mourning period and any who did not comply were expelled from the community. Early Mahafaly kings lived in compounds that had paths radiating out toward each of the major surrounding villages in his territory, and his power was compounded by the possession of royal relics believed to hold supernatural powers. The king ruled over a society that was divided into those of privilege (renilemy), commoners (valohazomanga) and migrants to the area from elsewhere (folahazomanga). The renilemy consisted of those who were descendants of the most powerful chief during the establishment of the Maroserana dynasty, Tsileliky ("not conquerable"); the descendants of Tsileliky's companions and favored subjects; and particular individuals (or their descendants) who had received a royal favor. The king was supported by a councillor (ombiasy) as well as a priest (mpisoro) who was responsible for conducting animal sacrifices at the communal altar (hangomaza-lava). The society was divided into numerous clans, some of which held particular responsibilities such as blacksmithing and honey collecting. Heads of these clans were elected under the title of "royal friend" (rainitsy ny mpanjaka) and had an official councillor (ondaty-be) similar to the king himself. Only the heads of clans and the king were authorized to carry a large iron spear (beraha), which served as a symbol of their status.

=== Family affiliation ===
The household is the most important social affiliation among the Mahafaly. A household is defined as a group of cohabiting family members led by and "belonging to" the oldest male in the group. Children remain a member of their father's household until reaching adulthood, at which point young men establish their own house and family near their father's house, while young women marry and move into their husband's house. Men retain custody of children in the event of a divorce. It is not uncommon among traditional families for a man to have more than one wife. Immediate family members living together in a household are responsible for organizing the weddings and funerals of their family members, as well as covering expenses related to healing ceremonies (rombo) for ill family members.

A Mahafaly individual's social identity is also defined by his or her foko - a grouping of all descendants of a living man or woman; an individual belongs simultaneously to multiple foko. Members of a foko typically only gather or work together when the head of the foko is ill, in need of assistance, or has died, in which case the members will organize to take action as needed. An even stronger identity is one's tariha, the living descendants of a male line of descent traced back to a common male ancestor who died recently enough that the oldest members of the group can trace their kinship ties to him and remember some features about him as a person. All sacrifices to the ancestors (soro) are made in the name of this common ancestor, and the oldest male tariha member is responsible for carrying out these rituals on behalf of the group. Members of a tariha typically live near each other and form a village or cluster of villages.

== Culture ==
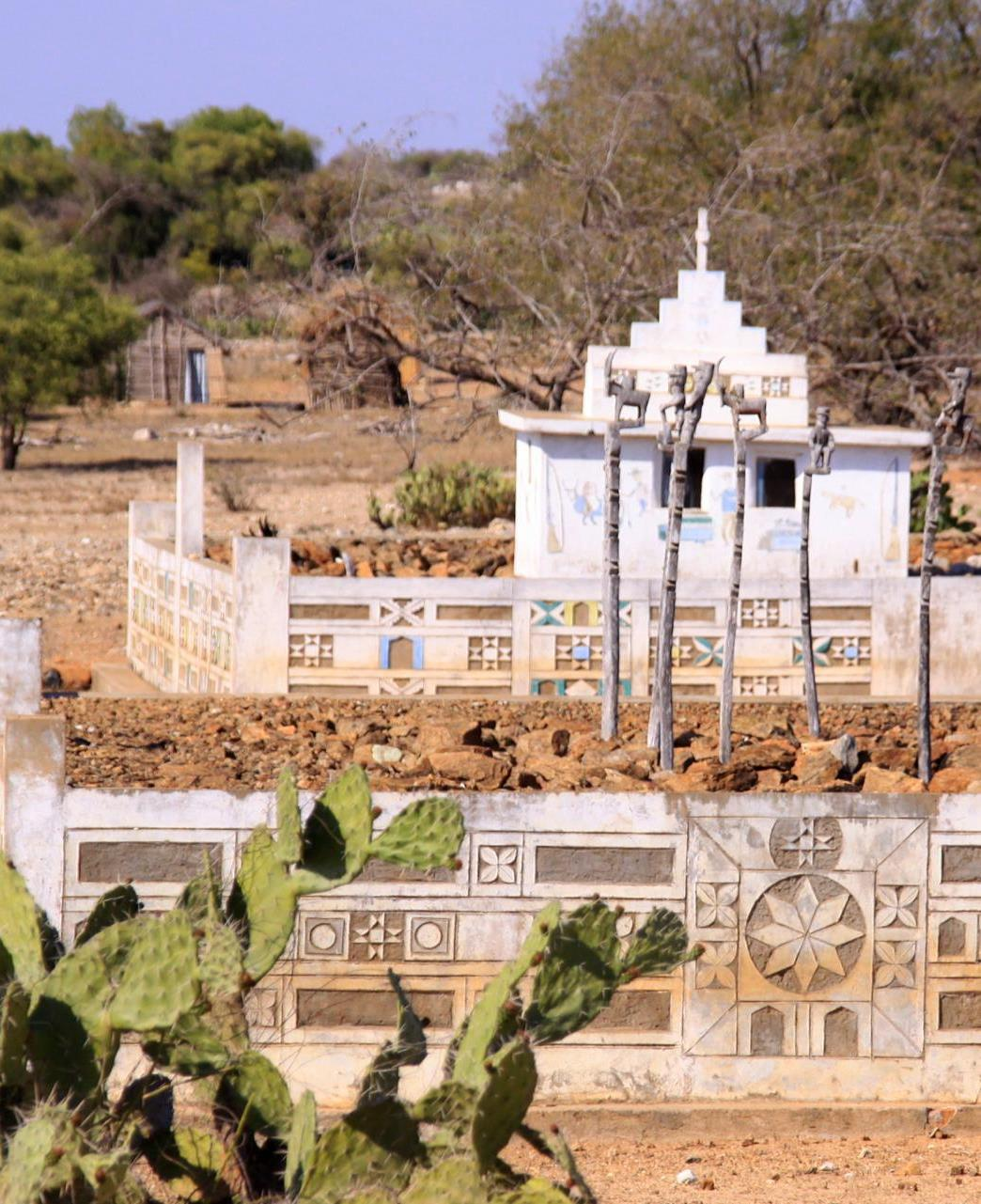
Mahafaly tomb

The Mahafaly are mainly involved in farming and cattle raising. Zebu hold an important place in society for both economic and spiritual reasons, being seen as symbolic of life and nobility, as well as a means of linking the living to the ancestors. Members of a household work together to undertake farming and other livelihood activities to meet the family's subsistence needs. The younger male family members are typically responsible for herding the family's cattle and men of all ages work in the fields. Women assist with work in the fields and are also responsible for household tasks like cooking and fetching water, often assisted by their children and sometimes by their husband. Clothing in this region was traditionally made of spun cotton, which was cultivated locally; less frequently, locally spun silk was also sometimes used.

=== Fady ===
Fady "taboos" have long played an important role in the cultural life of the Mahafaly. Historically, common taboos among the Mahafaly included a prohibition against women drinking from the same cup or sitting on the same mat as their husband, standing while speaking to a king, and Mahafaly women historically being allowed to smoke tobacco but not chew it. Throughout Mahafaly country, it was forbidden for white people to enter; if one managed to penetrate the territory, the chief of that land was put to death. Kings had the power to place a taboo on certain words that could never be spoken again by members of the community.

=== Funeral rites ===
As in much of Madagascar, the Mahafaly bury their dead in tombs. The tombs of family members were historically located in sacred forest areas far from the houses of the living, although due to deforestation and other factors this is no longer always the case. Tombs are typically clustered together and laid out according to the rank and role of the family members, with the eldest ancestor's tomb the furthest south, his descendants to his north, and wives and unmarried family members to his west. Funerals consist of several ceremonies, and zebu are sacrificed at each; their skulls are placed on top of the tomb. The first ceremony is one of preparation for the following events and the ombilahy zebu sacrificed at this ceremony is particularly important because the meat is shared with all those gathered as a gesture of unity and friendship.

The Mahafaly also decorate their tombs with aloalo, tall wooden posts carved with geometric patterns and occasionally topped with carved zebu or other figures that hold significance for the deceased. These posts are meant to indicate that a person has died and attained the status of "ancestor" (razana), which serve as intermediaries between the living and God; the tomb is the ancestor's new home, as death is not seen as an ending but as a transformation into another phase of life. Aloalo today are considered an iconic symbol of Madagascar, and the Mahafaly homeland encompassing its semi-arid ecosystem and wealth of tombs and funerary art has been added to the Tentative List of World Heritage Sites. Tomb sites may only be visited during funerals or to retrieve wandering cattle but are otherwise strictly off limits.

Households are not allowed to produce their own aloalo or coffins or make use of their own tomb construction materials or ombilahy zebu - all must be purchased or commissioned from a specialized clan that the household has historically relied on to produce these items, and the household must pay for them in zebu and food. Carrying out the various ceremonies and tomb construction can take a year or more, during which time the wife of the deceased must stay with the corpse in the deceased's home. His oldest son is responsible for procuring the vatolahy - upright stone markers up to two meters tall that form part of the tomb structure - while his daughters are responsible for procuring the aloalo and sacrificial zebus; the remaining family members and friends procure the stones required for the construction of the tomb. The tomb's size is consequently dependent on the size of the family and the deceased's social standing.

== Language ==
The Mahafaly speak a dialect of the Malagasy language, which is a branch of the Malayo-Polynesian language group derived from the Barito languages, spoken in southern Borneo.

== Economy ==
The Mahafaly are primarily zebu cattle herders and pastoralists. Cotton has been cultivated by the Mahafaly since the 16th century. They also gather wild honey, sell charcoal, weave baskets and mats, practice woodworking, cultivate kitchen gardens and raise small livestock.

== Bibliography ==
- Ade Ajayi, Jacob Festus (1998). General history of Africa: Africa in the nineteenth century until the 1880s. Paris: UNESCO. ISBN 9780520067011.
- Campbell, Gwyn (2012). David Griffiths and the Missionary "History of Madagascar". Leiden, the Netherlands: Brill. ISBN 978-90-04-20980-0.
- Condra, Jill (2013). Encyclopedia of National Dress: Traditional Clothing Around the World. Los Angeles: ABC Clio. ISBN 978-0-313-37637-5.
- Diagram Group (2013). Encyclopedia of African Peoples. San Francisco, CA: Routledge. ISBN 9781135963415.
- Eggert, Karl (1981). "Who are the Mahafaly? Cultural and social misidentification in southwestern Madagascar". Omaly sy anio: Hier et aujourd'hui (PDF). Vol. 13–14. Antananarivo: Université de Madagascar, Département d'histoire. pp. 149–176.
- Gennep, A.V. (1904). Tabou Et Totémisme à Madagascar (in French). Paris: Ernest Leroux. ISBN 978-5-87839-721-6.
- LeHoullier, Sara (August 2010). Madagascar (Travel Companion). Other Places Publishing. ISBN 978-0-9822619-5-8.
- Ogot, Bethwell A. (1992). Africa from the Sixteenth to the Eighteenth Century. Paris: UNESCO. ISBN 9789231017117.
- Shoup, John A. (17 October 2011). Ethnic Groups of Africa and the Middle East: An Encyclopedia: An Encyclopedia. ABC-CLIO. ISBN 978-1-59884-363-7.
- Various (2003). International Encyclopedia of Linguistics Vol. 1. Oxford University Press. ISBN 978-0-19-513977-8.
