= Atsimo-Andrefana =

Coordinates: 23.414°S 43.806°E

Atsimo Andrefana Region Région Atsimo Andrefana
- Region
- Location in Madagascar
- Country: Madagascar
- Capital: Toliara

Government
  - Governor: Edally Tovondrainy Ranoelson

Area
  - Total: 66,236 km^{2} (25,574 sq mi)

Population (2018)
  - Total: 1,799,088
  - Density: 27.162/km^{2} (70.349/sq mi)
- Time zone: UTC3 (EAT)
- HDI (2018): 0.418 low · 21st of 22

Atsimo-Andrefana (South West) is a region of Madagascar. It borders Menabe in north, Amoron'i Mania and Haute Matsiatra in northeast, Ihorombe and Anosy in east and Androy in southeast. The capital is Toliara and the population was 1,799,088 in 2018. Atsimo Andrefana is geographically the largest of all Malagasy regions with an area of 66,236 km^{2} (25,574 sq mi).

== Administrative divisions ==
Atsimo-Andrefana Region is divided into nine districts, which are sub-divided into 100 communes.

- Ampanihy District – 20 communes
- Ankazoabo District – 5 communes
- Benenitra District – 5 communes
- Betioky-Atsimo District – 22 communes
- Beroroha District – 9 communes
- Morombe District – 8 communes
- Sakaraha District – 12 communes
- Toliara I District – 1 commune
- Toliara II District – 19 communes

== Transport ==
=== Airports ===
- Ampanihy Airport
- Andavadoaka Airport
- Ankazoabo Airport
- Beroroha Airport
- Betioky Airport
- Morombe Airport
- Tanandava Airport
- Toliara Airport

== Protected areas ==
In Atsimo-Andrefana are found the following protected areas:

- Part of Mangoky Ihotry Wetland Complex
- Velondriake New Protected Area
- Tsinjoriake New Protected Area
- Analandraza Analavelo New Protected Area
- Ranobe Bay New Protected Area
- Ranobe PK32 New Protected Area
- Atsimo Andrefan'Ifotaky New Protected Area
- Vohidefo New Protected Area
- Beza Mahafaly Reserve
- Mikea National Park
- Nosy Ve-Androka National Park
- Zombitse-Vohibasia National Park
- Tsimanampetsotsa National Park
- Reniala Reserve
- Soariake New Protected Area
- Amoron'i Onilahy New Protected Area

== Rivers ==
Mayor river in Atsimo-Andrefana is the Onilahy River and in the north the Mangoky River. Also the Fiherenana River and Linta River flows in that region while the Menarandra River forms the border with region of Androy in the south.

== Economy ==
=== Mining ===
- Basibasy mine
- Ankililoaka mine
