= Analavelona =

Mountain in Madagascar

Analavelona, also known as Analavelona Massif, is a mountain in southwestern Madagascar. The massif is home to an enclave of montane subhumid forest, which is considered a sacred forest by the local people and notable for its biodiversity.

== Geography ==
Analavelona is located in Sakaraha District of Atsimo-Andrefana region of Madagascar, west-northwest of the town of Sakaraha. The massif extends generally northeast–southwest, with steep slopes incised by stream valleys. The highest peak is Mitsinjoriake at 1325 meters elevation.

The massif is surrounded by a mostly arid peneplain. The southeastern slope receives more orographic precipitation than the surrounding region, and the higher rainfall sustains subhumid forests. Rivers including the Fiherenana, which flows in the southeast, rise from springs on the mountain.

== Flora and fauna ==
The forests of Analavelona are a southwestern outlier of Madagascar subhumid forests, which cover the highlands of central Madagascar. The forests are surrounded at lower elevations by semi-arid succulent woodlands. The nearest subhumid forests to Analavelona are on Isalo Massif, about 100 km to the east. Analavelona is home to plants and animals characteristic of the subhumid forests, as well as some endemic species found only on the mountain.

The varied elevation, climate, and soil composition on the massif supports diverse plant communities. The lower slopes are home to dense humid evergreen forest. The humid evergreen forests are tall and stratified, and canopy trees include species of Uapaca and Dalbergia, with abundant lianas and strangler figs. Dense sclerophyllous montane forests are found on the plateau and upper slopes, and generally have an open understory. There is xerophilous brushland on rocky slopes, with species of Dracaena and Aloe. The forests and brushland are interspersed with areas of grassland.

The forest is home to several rare and limited-range plants. Spondias tefyi is a species of tree found only in the Analavelona forests and the deciduous forests of Zombitse about 50 km to the southeast. Dalbergia hirticalyx is a large forest tree found in the Analavelona forest, with smaller populations in Zombitse and in Bongolava in central Madagascar. Other native plants include Aloe analavelonensis, Euphorbia analavelonensis, and Pseudodicliptera humilis.

Birds present include the green jery (Neomixis viridis), forest fody (Foudia omissa) and spectacled tetraka (Phyllastrephus zosterops), which are characteristic of the subhumid forests. Appert's tetraka (Phyllastrephus apperti) is found only here and in the Zombitse forests.

Native mammals include Verreaux's sifaka (Propithecus verreauxi), ring-tailed lemur (Lemur catta), Zombitse sportive lemur (Lepilemur hubbardorum), pale fork-marked lemur (Phaner pallescens), red-fronted brown lemur (Eulemur rufifrons), and the carnivore fossa (Cryptoprocta ferox).

The Analavelona wood-millipede (Hylekobolus analavelona) and Analavelona giant pill-millipede (Zoosphaerium analavelona) are endemic to Analavelona Massif.

== Conservation ==
The Analavelona Forest, also known as Alandraza Analavelo, is considered a sacred forest by the local Bara people, for whom the forest has high social and cultural value as well as being a source of timber, food, and other forest products. A community-based management program, assisted by the Missouri Botanical Garden's Madagascar Conservation Program, has been managing the forest for over a decade.

The forest was designated a classified forest by the Government of Madagascar. On 28 April 2015 (Decree No. 2015-766) the government designated the forest a natural monument, officially the Monument Naturel de la Forêt Sacrée Alandraza Analavelo (Alandraza Analavelo Sacred Forest Natural Monument), with an area of 44.87 km^{2}. It is also proposed as a national park.
