= Sakaraha District =

Coordinates: 22°55′0″S 44°32′59″E

Sakaraha
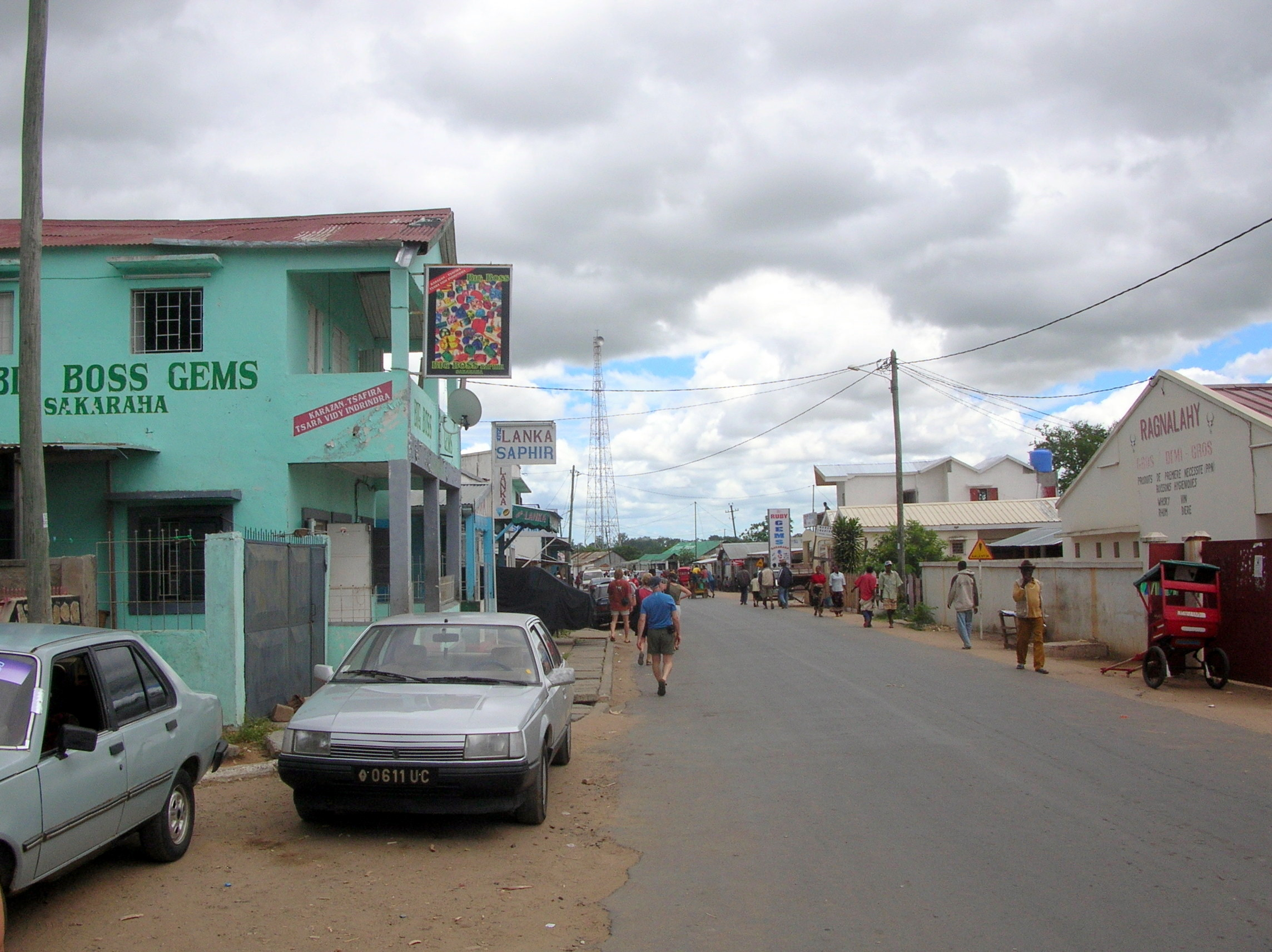

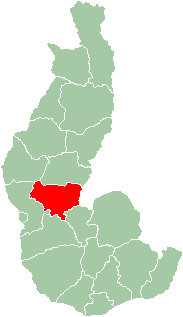
- Map of former Toliara Province showing the location of Sakaraha (red).
- Country: Madagascar
- Region: Atsimo-Andrefana

Sakaraha is a district located in Atsimo-Andrefana Region, south-western Madagascar.

== Communes ==
The district is further divided into 12 communes:

- Ambinany
- Amboronabo
- Andalamasina Vineta
- Andranolava
- Bereketa
- Mahaboboka
- Miary Lamatihy
- Miary Taheza
- Mihavatsy
- Mikoboka
- Mitsinjo, Sakaraha
- Sakaraha

== Geography ==
Sakaraha is situated along route nationale No. 7 (Tuléar-Fianarantsoa) at 134 km from Tuléar, 64 km from Andranovory and 84 km from Ilakaka. Zombitse-Vohibasia National Park is located in the district, east of the town of Sakaraha. Analavelona Massif is in the western portion of the district.
