= Dalbergia hirticalyx =

Conservation status
- Endangered (IUCN 3.1)

Scientific classification
- Kingdom: Plantae
- Clade: Tracheophytes
- Clade: Angiosperms
- Clade: Eudicots
- Clade: Rosids
- Order: Fabales
- Family: Fabaceae
- Subfamily: Faboideae
- Genus: Dalbergia
- Species: D. hirticalyx

Binomial name
- Dalbergia hirticalyx Bosser & R.Rabev.

Species of legume

Dalbergia hirticalyx is a species of legume in the family Fabaceae. It is found only in Madagascar. It is threatened by habitat loss.

== Description ==
Dalbergia hirticalyx is a large tree which grows to 29 meters tall. It flowers in September, and fruits from November to February and in June.

== Range and habitat ==
Dalbergia hirticalyx is known from three separate locations in southwestern and west-central Madagascar. In the southwest it is found on the Analavelona Massif, and in Zombitse-Vohibasia National Park about 50 km southeast of Analavelona. The third and disjunct population at Bongolava Province of west-central Madagascar.

At Analavelona and Bongolava it is found in mid-elevation subhumid forests, and in lower-elevation dry deciduous forests at Zombitse, between 500 and 1,300 meters elevation.

== Uses ==
Dalbergia hirticalyx, like the other species of Dalbergia on Madagascar, is prized for its timber, which is traditionally used to build coffins.

== Conservation ==
The species is threatened with habitat loss and a declining population and area of occupancy. All the current known locations of Dalbergia hirticalyx are found in areas threatened with from human-set fires to clear land for livestock grazing, illegal timber logging, and logging for traditional uses and for firewood. The current status of the Bongolava population is unknown, and it may have been extirpated from the area. The species is assessed as endangered.

In the Analavelona Forest a community-based conservation project aims to conserve Dalbergia hirticalyx by cataloging existing populations and developing sustainable timber harvesting practices.
