= Cadorela =

Scientific classification
- Domain: Eukaryota
- Kingdom: Animalia
- Phylum: Arthropoda
- Class: Insecta
- Order: Lepidoptera
- Superfamily: Noctuoidea
- Family: Erebidae
- Tribe: Lymantriini
- Genus: Cadorela; Griveaud, 1973
- Species: C. translucida

Binomial name
- Cadorela translucida Griveaud, 1973

Genus of moths

Cadorela is a monotypic moth genus in the subfamily Lymantriinae. Its only species, Cadorela translucida, is found in south-western Madagascar. Both the genus and the species were first described by Paul Griveaud in 1973.

The male of this species has a wingspan of 18 mm, head and front are clear brown, palpi beige, fine and turned downwards. Antennae are dark brown and largely pectinated (comb like). Thorax is brown black, abdomen brown black on the upperside, and brown yellowish on the underside.

The holotype of this species was found east of Sakaraha in the Zombitse-Vohibasia National Park at 640 m.
