= Spondias tefyi =

Conservation status
- Vulnerable (IUCN 3.1)

Scientific classification
- Kingdom: Plantae
- Clade: Tracheophytes
- Clade: Angiosperms
- Clade: Eudicots
- Clade: Rosids
- Order: Sapindales
- Family: Anacardiaceae
- Genus: Spondias
- Species: S. tefyi

Binomial name
- Spondias tefyi J.D.Mitch., Daly & Randrian.

Species of flowering plant

Spondias tefyi is a species of flowering plant in the cashew family, Anacardiaceae. It is endemic to Madagascar, and is the only known species of genus Spondias native to the island.

== Description ==
Spondias tefyi is a deciduous tree, reaching 10 to 15 meters in height, with a trunk diameter up to 60 cm. It flowers in November, and fruits between December and May.

== Range and habitat ==
Spondias tefyi is endemic to southwestern Madagascar, where it is known from eight locations on Analavelona Massif, in Zombitse forest, and at Marofandiliha. The species' estimated extent of occurrence (EOO) is 10,218 km^{2}, and its estimated area of occupancy (AOO) is 56 km^{2}.

It occurs from 400 to 1100 meters elevation. On the Analavelona Massif it is found in subhumid forest between 817 and 1050 meters elevation. In Zombitse it is found in dry deciduous forest above 400 meters elevation.

== Etymology ==
The species name tefyi honors Tefy Andriamihajarivo, who first realized that the trees found at Analavelona constituted a new species.
