= Zoosphaerium album =

Conservation status
- Near Threatened (IUCN 3.1)

Scientific classification
- Kingdom: Animalia
- Phylum: Arthropoda
- Subphylum: Myriapoda
- Class: Diplopoda
- Order: Sphaerotheriida
- Family: Arthrosphaeridae
- Genus: Zoosphaerium
- Species: Z. album

Binomial name
- Zoosphaerium album Wesener, 2009

Species of millipede

Zoosphaerium album, also known as the giant opal pill millipede, is a species of pill millipede within the family Arthrosphaeridae and order Sphaerotheriida. It is an endemic species, found only within the Vohibasia forest of Western Madagascar. The species name album, refers to the white colouration of the pill millipedes exoskeleton.

== Description ==
Zoosphaerium album reach lengths of up to 34 mm long, with both males and females reaching a similar size. Z. album exhibits yellowish white tergites, which form the segmented dorsal exoskeleton of the pill millipede. These tergites are adorned with a light, shiny-green field that extends dorso-laterally on each side. The anterior margin of the collum, thoracic shield, and tergites displaying a green colour, while the rest of the texture appears yellowish-white. The head, antenna, and legs of Z. album are also green. The walking legs of Z. album hosts tarsi of usual size, measuring approximately 3.8 times as long as they are wide. Additionally, the third podomere of the anterior telopods possesses a single large, sclerotized tooth. Z. album also exhibits endotergal marginal bristles that slightly extend beyond the tergite. The texture of the tergites is smooth and glabrous, and the antennomeres 1–5 possess sclerotized teeth. The disc is adorned with 14–19 (-28) apical cones, and the antennomeres lack a groove.

The third podomere of the posterior telopods in Z. album is weakly curved, featuring approximately 25 large, sclerotized teeth on the posterior side. Additionally, it has two large, non-sclerotized lobes and five thin spines. The male harp exhibits two stridulation ribs, while each side of the washboard contains 2 or 3 ribs. Notably, Z. album does not possess locking carinae on its anal shield. The operculum of the vulva has a unique shape, with only a very weak notch on the apical margin, sometimes appearing well-rounded in certain specimens. The coloration pattern of Z. album tends to fade in preserved specimens, with the green colouration gradually turning brown as the specimens are stored in alcohol.

=== Similar species ===
Zoosphaerium album shares similarities with another species, Z. libidinosum, in terms of the shape of their posterior telopods. However, there are distinguishing features that set the species apart. Z. album can be distinguished by features such as its weakly bell-shaped male anal shield, smaller size, unique colouration pattern, and slight variations in the shape of the anterior telopods and vulva.

== Distribution and habitat ==
Zoosphaerium album is currently known to exist solely in the subhumid forest of Vohibasia, which is part of the Zombitse-Vohibasia National Park. The forest is located in the Toliara Province of Southwest Madagascar. This species appears to be endemic to this specific region and has not been documented elsewhere. The forest habitat is a transitional zone between the dry Western and humid Eastern forests of Madagascar. The forest of Vohibasia provides the primary habitat for Z. album, where it resides in the leaf litter and understory vegetation of the forest floor. Z. album has been recorded at elevations of 780 meters above sea level.
