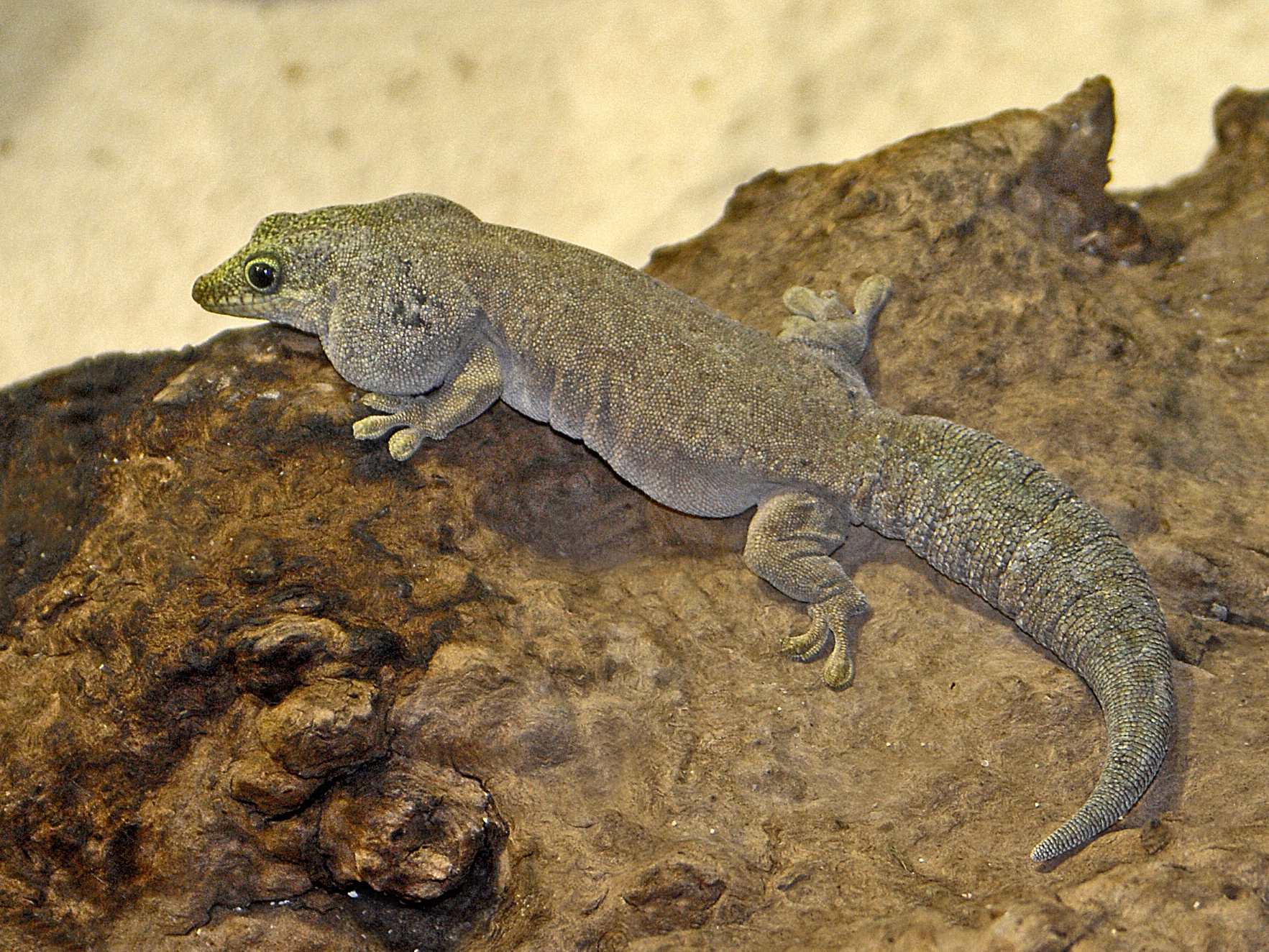
- Female of Phelsuma standingi, with prominent endolymphatic chalk sacs

Conservation status
- Vulnerable (IUCN 3.1)

Scientific classification
- Kingdom: Animalia
- Phylum: Chordata
- Class: Reptilia
- Order: Squamata
- Suborder: Gekkota
- Family: Gekkonidae
- Genus: Phelsuma
- Species: P. standingi

Binomial name
- Phelsuma standingi Methuen & Hewitt, 1913
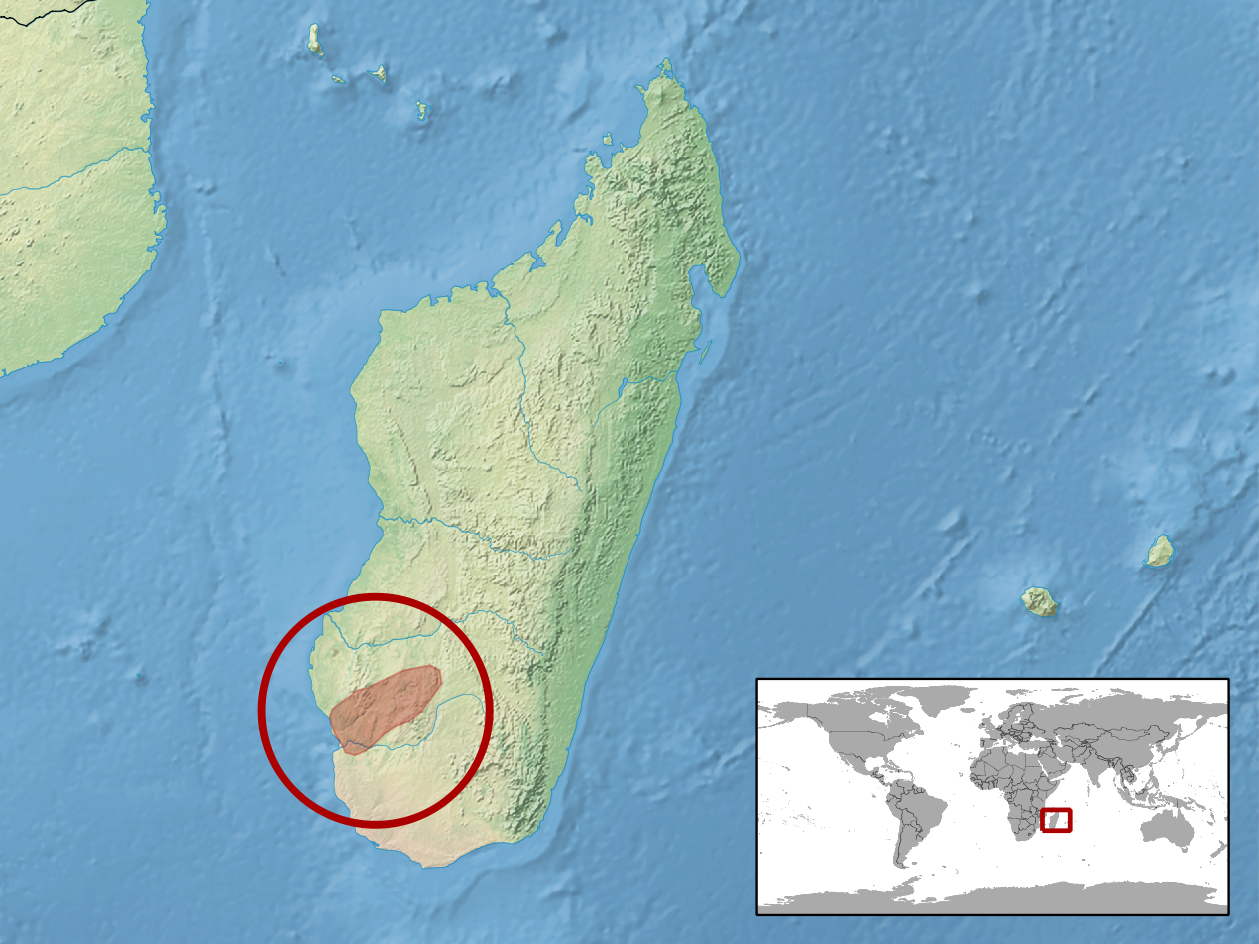

= Standing's day gecko =

Species of lizard

Standing's day gecko (Phelsuma standingi) is an arboreal and diurnal species of lizard in the family Gekkonidae. The species is endemic to southwest Madagascar; it is threatened by illegal collection for the international pet trade and habitat loss. It is among the largest living species of day geckos. Standing's day gecko feeds on insects and nectar.

== Etymology ==
The generic name, Phelsuma, is a Latinized version of the last name of Dutch physician Murk van Phelsum. The specific name, standingi, is in honor of another physician, Doctor Herbert F. Standing of Antananarivo, Madagascar.

== Description ==
P. standingi is among the largest extant species of day geckos. It can reach a maximum total length (including tail) of 8-10″ (20-25.4cm), although larger is possible. The body colour can be quite variable, depending on light intensity. It can be brownish grey or bright green or turquoise with grey to blue reticulated markings on its body and head. The head and tail are often turquoise. Hatchlings have a yellowish green head and typical light bands and bars on their backs.

It is a sexually dimorphic species. In the males the cloacal area has very pronounced preanal pores and a bulge in the area of hemipenis. In many females two endolymphatic chalk sacs, located on each side of the neck, are well-developed, while in males usually they are just barely visible. These sacs store calcium, which is needed for the formation of egg shells.

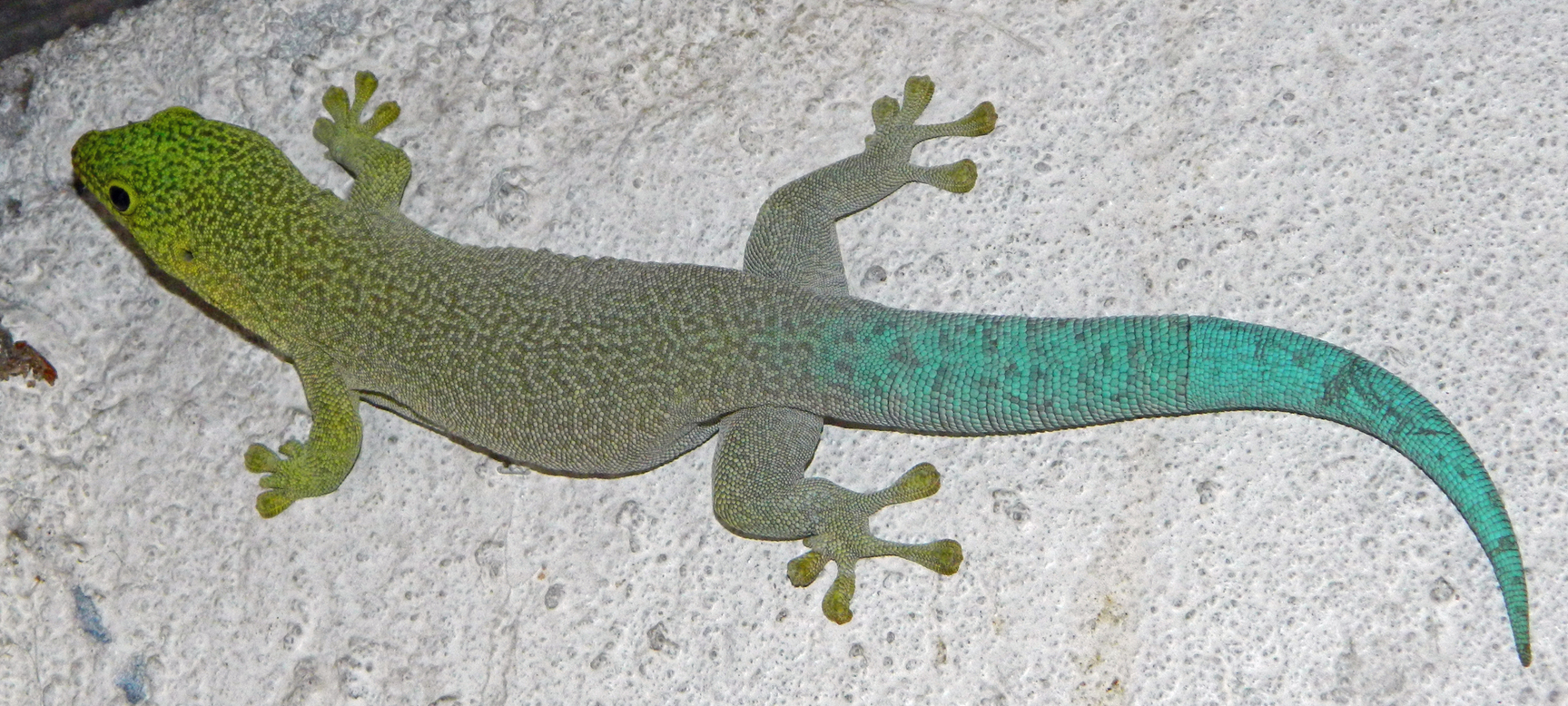
Adult

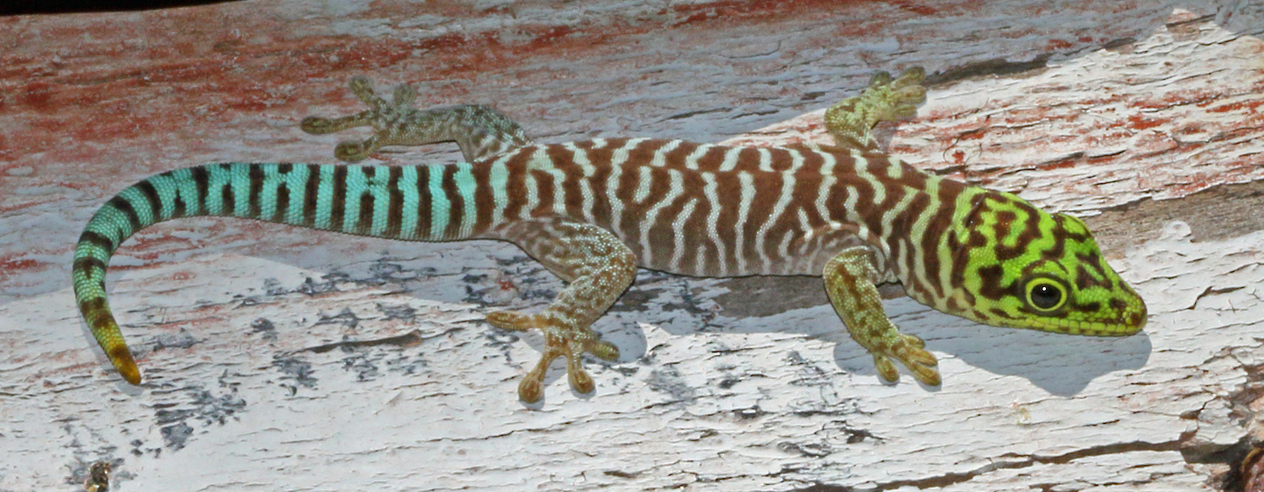
Juvenile

== Distribution and habitat ==
P. standingi is restricted to the arid southwest of Madagascar, specifically the region around Andranolaho, Sakaraha and in the Zombitse-Vohibasia National Park. This area has a unique thorn forest vegetation. The daytime temperature never drops under 20 °C (68 °F) and between January and December, the temperature can be as high as 40 °C (104 °F) in the shade. In July and August, the night temperature can drop to 13 °C (55 °F).

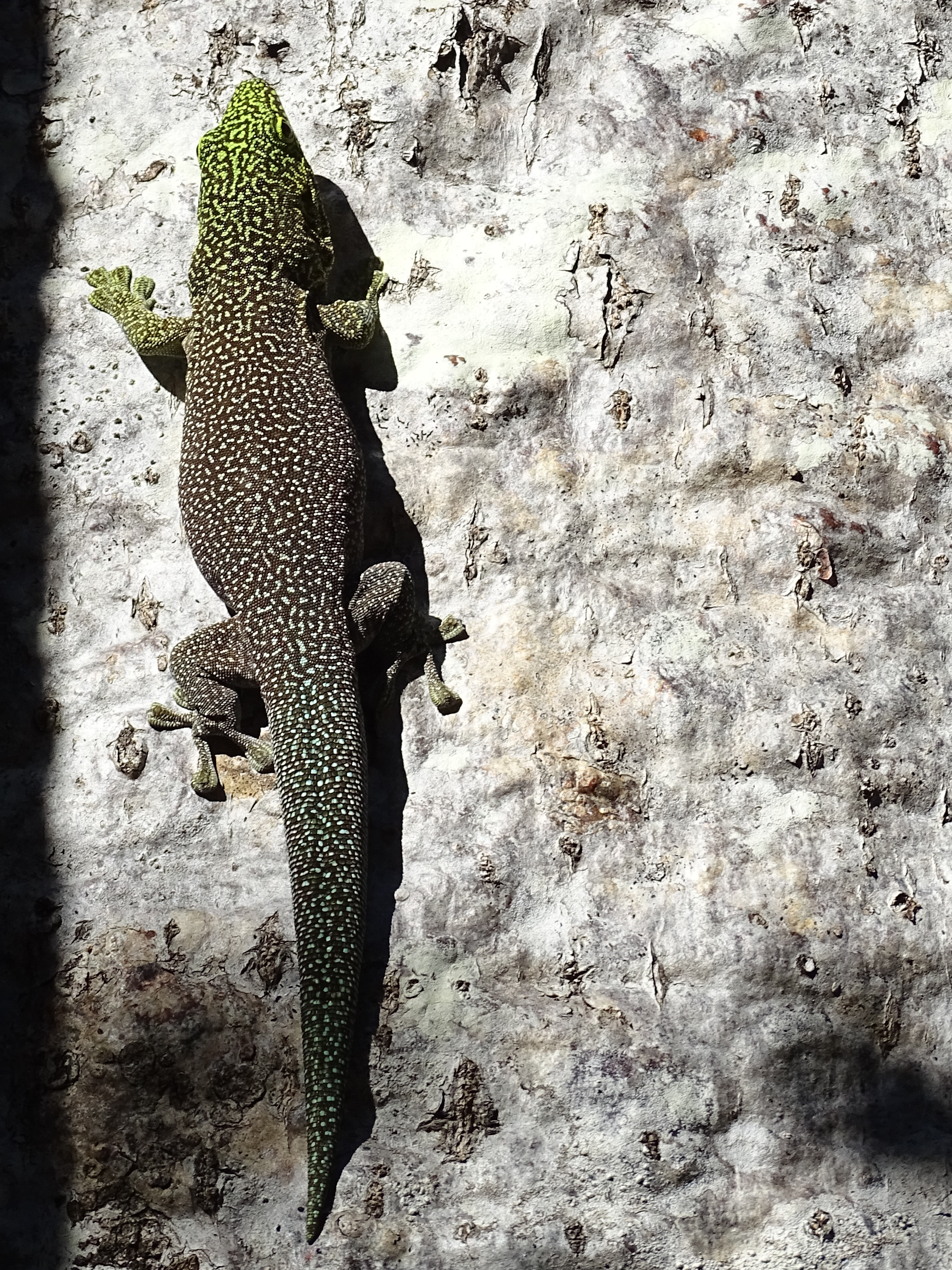
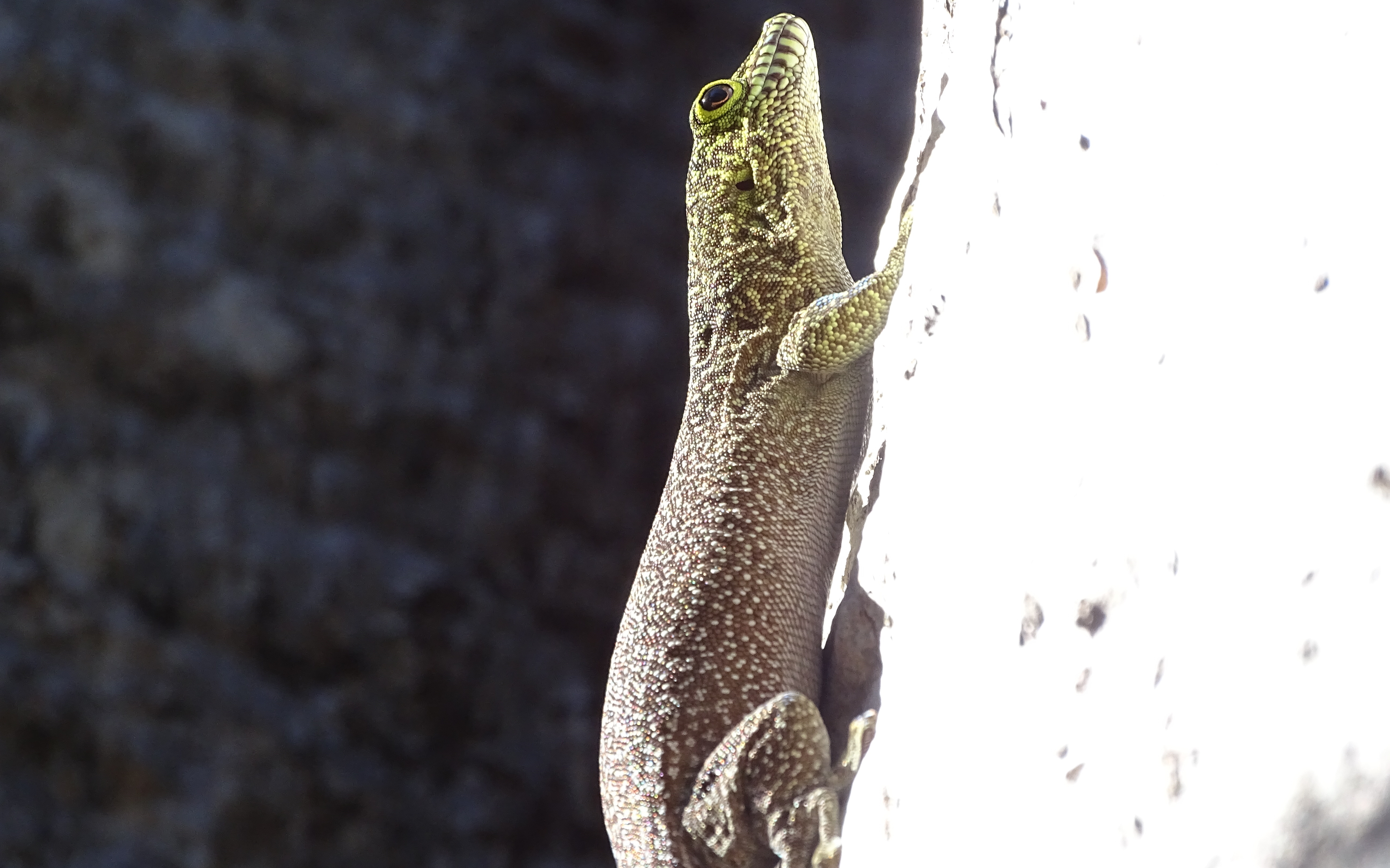
Standing's day gecko at Zombitse-Vohibasia National Park

== Diet ==
Standing's day gecko feeds on various insects, invertebrates, and even smaller lizards. It is omnivorous, however, supplementing its prey with soft, sweet fruit, pollen and nectar.

== Behaviour ==
Strictly an arboreal and diurnal species, P. standingi lives in pairs on trees, spending a lot of time basking in the sun on the highest and well exposed branches. The males are very territorial and will fight when in the presence of other males; females have this character towards other females, a behavior which is rather rare in geckos.

== Reproduction ==
P. standingi is oviparous. At a temperature of 28 °C (82 °F), the young will hatch after approximately 60–70 days. The juveniles measure 80 mm and reach sexual maturity after one year.

In captivity, Standing's day geckos can be expected to live up to 15-20 years when appropriately cared-for.
