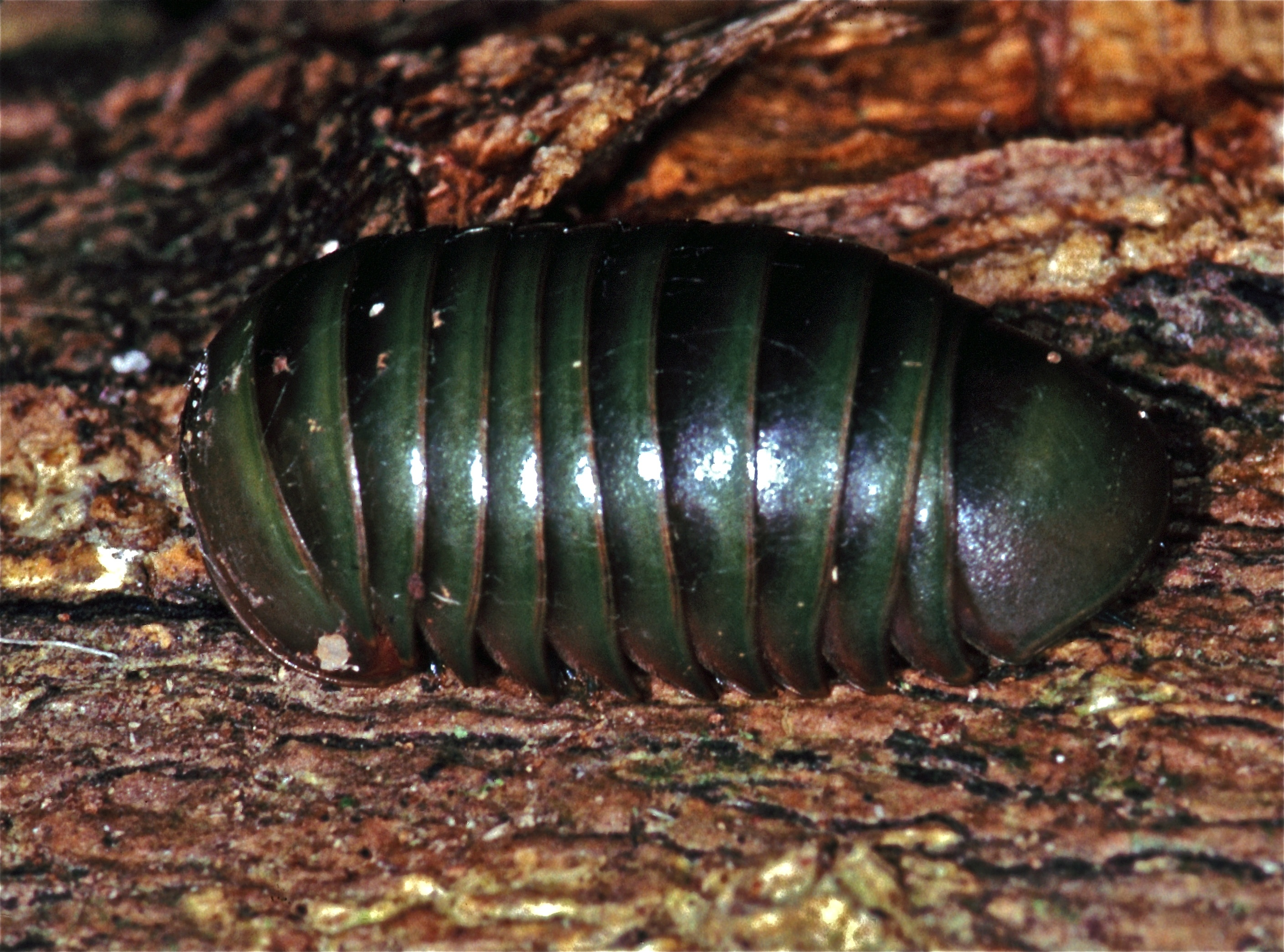
- A giant pill millipede in the genus Zoosphaerium

Scientific classification
- Kingdom: Animalia
- Phylum: Arthropoda
- Subphylum: Myriapoda
- Class: Diplopoda
- Order: Sphaerotheriida
- Family: Arthrosphaeridae
- Genus: Zoosphaerium; Pocock, 1895

= Zoosphaerium =

Genus of myriapods

Zoosphaerium is a genus of giant pill millipedes endemic to Madagascar. Some species within this genus express island gigantism. The largest of the known species of giant pill millipede known is Zoosphaerium neptunus, which is capable of growing to lengths of 90 mm (3.5 in).

== Distribution and habitat ==
Zoosphaerium is restricted to the island of Madagascar. Madagascar is a hotspot for biodiversity and localized endemism, as a result some species occur sympatrically as microendemics. Species within the genus Zoosphaerium can be found living amongst damp leaf litter in forest and jungle habitats.

== Species list ==
Below is a list of all 74 known species:

- Zoosphaerium actaeon (White, 1859)
- Zoosphaerium album Wesener, 2009
- Zoosphaerium alluaudi (De Saussure & Zehntner, 1902)
- Zoosphaerium amabile Wesener, 2009
- Zoosphaerium ambatovaky Wesener & Sagorny, 2021
- Zoosphaerium ambrense Wesener, 2009
- Zoosphaerium analavelona Wesener, 2009
- Zoosphaerium anale (De Saussure & Zehntner, 1897)
- Zoosphaerium anomalum (De Saussure & Zehntner, 1902)
- Zoosphaerium arborealis Wesener & Sierwald, 2005
- Zoosphaerium aureum Wesener, 2009
- Zoosphaerium bambusoides Wesener & Bespalova, 2010
- Zoosphaerium bemanevika Sagorny & Wesener, 2017
- Zoosphaerium bilobum Wesener, 2009
- Zoosphaerium blandum (De Saussure & Zehntner, 1902)
- Zoosphaerium broelemanni Wesener, 2009
- Zoosphaerium campanulatum (De Saussure & Zehntner, 1902)
- Zoosphaerium coquerelianum (De Saussure & Zehntner, 1902)
- Zoosphaerium corystoides Wesener, 2009
- Zoosphaerium crassum (Butler, 1878)
- Zoosphaerium darthvaderi Wesener & Bespalova, 2010
- Zoosphaerium denticulatum Wesener, 2009
- Zoosphaerium discolor Wesener, 2009
- Zoosphaerium elegans (Lenz, 1881)
- Zoosphaerium endemicum Wesener, 2009
- Zoosphaerium fisheri Wesener, 2009
- Zoosphaerium fraternarium Jeekel, 1999
- Zoosphaerium glabrum (Butler, 1873)
- Zoosphaerium haackeri Wesener, 2009
- Zoosphaerium heleios Wesener & Bespalova, 2010
- Zoosphaerium hippocastanum (Gervais, 1847)
- Zoosphaerium ignotum Wesener, 2009
- Zoosphaerium immane (Karsch, 1881)
- Zoosphaerium isalo Wesener, 2009
- Zoosphaerium lambertoni (Brolemann, 1922)
- Zoosphaerium lamprinum (Butler, 1878)
- Zoosphaerium latum (Butler, 1872)
- Zoosphaerium libidinosum (De Saussure & Zehntner, 1897)
- Zoosphaerium masoala Wesener & Sagorny, 2021
- Zoosphaerium micropilligerum Wesener, 2009
- Zoosphaerium minutus Sagorny & Wesener, 2017
- Zoosphaerium mitoho Wesener, 2009
- Zoosphaerium muscorum Wesener & Bespalova, 2010
- Zoosphaerium neptunus (Butler, 1872)
- Zoosphaerium nigrum Wesener & Sagorny, 2021
- Zoosphaerium piligerum (De Saussure & Zehntner, 1897)
- Zoosphaerium platylabum (De Saussure & Zehntner, 1897)
- Zoosphaerium priapus (De Saussure & Zehntner, 1897)
- Zoosphaerium pseudoblandum Wesener, 2009
- Zoosphaerium pseudopiligerum Wesener, 2009
- Zoosphaerium pseudoplatylabum Wesener, 2009
- Zoosphaerium pseudopriapus Wesener, 2009
- Zoosphaerium pulchellum Wesener, 2009
- Zoosphaerium pygidiale (De Saussure & Zehntner, 1902)
- Zoosphaerium reflexum (Brolemann, 1922)
- Zoosphaerium reticulatum (Butler, 1878)
- Zoosphaerium sakanum (Attems, 1910)
- Zoosphaerium silens Wesener & Sagorny, 2021
- Zoosphaerium smaragdinum Wesener, 2009
- Zoosphaerium solitarium Wesener, 2009
- Zoosphaerium spinopiligerum Wesener & Sagorny, 2021
- Zoosphaerium stigmaticum (Butler, 1873)
- Zoosphaerium subreflexum Jeekel, 1999
- Zoosphaerium tainkintana Wesener, 2009
- Zoosphaerium tampolo Wesener, 2009
- Zoosphaerium testaceum (Olivier, 1792)
- Zoosphaerium tigrioculatum Wesener & Bespalova, 2010
- Zoosphaerium trichordum Wesener, 2009
- Zoosphaerium tsingy Wesener, 2009
- Zoosphaerium villosum Wesener & Sierwald, 2005
- Zoosphaerium viridissimum Wesener, 2009
- Zoosphaerium voahangy Wesener & Sagorny, 2021
- Zoosphaerium voeltzkowianum (De Saussure & Zehntner, 1901)
- Zoosphaerium xerophilum Wesener, 2009
