= Bereketa =

- Location in Madagascar
- Coordinates: 23°7′S 44°24′E
- Country: Madagascar
- Region: Atsimo-Andrefana
- District: Sakaraha
- Elevation: 341 m (1,119 ft)

Population (2001)
  - Total: 6,000
- Time zone: UTC3 (EAT)

Bereketa is a town and commune (Malagasy: kaominina) in Madagascar. It belongs to the district of Sakaraha, which is a part of Atsimo-Andrefana Region. The population of the commune was estimated to be approximately 6,000 in 2001 commune census.

Primary and junior level secondary education are available in town. The majority 60% of the population of the commune are farmers, while an additional 30% receives their livelihood from raising livestock. The most important crop is cassava, while other important products are maize and rice. Services provide employment for 5% of the population. Additionally fishing employs 5% of the population.
