= Andranolava =

- Location in Madagascar
- Coordinates: 22°39′S 44°41′E
- Country: Madagascar
- Region: Atsimo-Andrefana
- District: Sakaraha
- Elevation: 558 m (1,831 ft)

Population (2001)
  - Total: 3,000
- Time zone: UTC3 (EAT)
- Postal code: 620

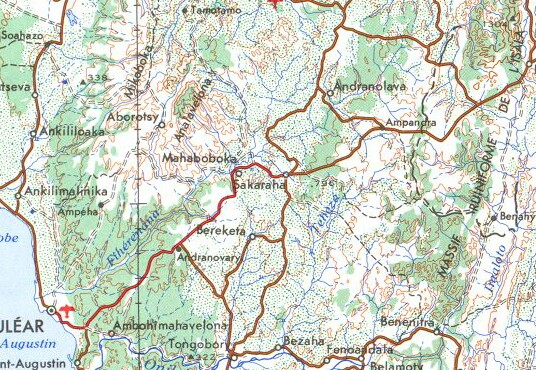
situation map of Andranolava

Andranolava is a rural municipality in Madagascar. It belongs to the district of Sakaraha, which is a part of Atsimo-Andrefana Region. The population of the commune was estimated to be approximately 3,000 in 2001 commune census.

Only primary schooling is available. The majority 50% of the population of the commune are farmers, while an additional 45% receives their livelihood from raising livestock. The most important crop is rice, while other important products are cassava and onions. Services provide employment for 1% of the population. Additionally fishing employs 4% of the population.
