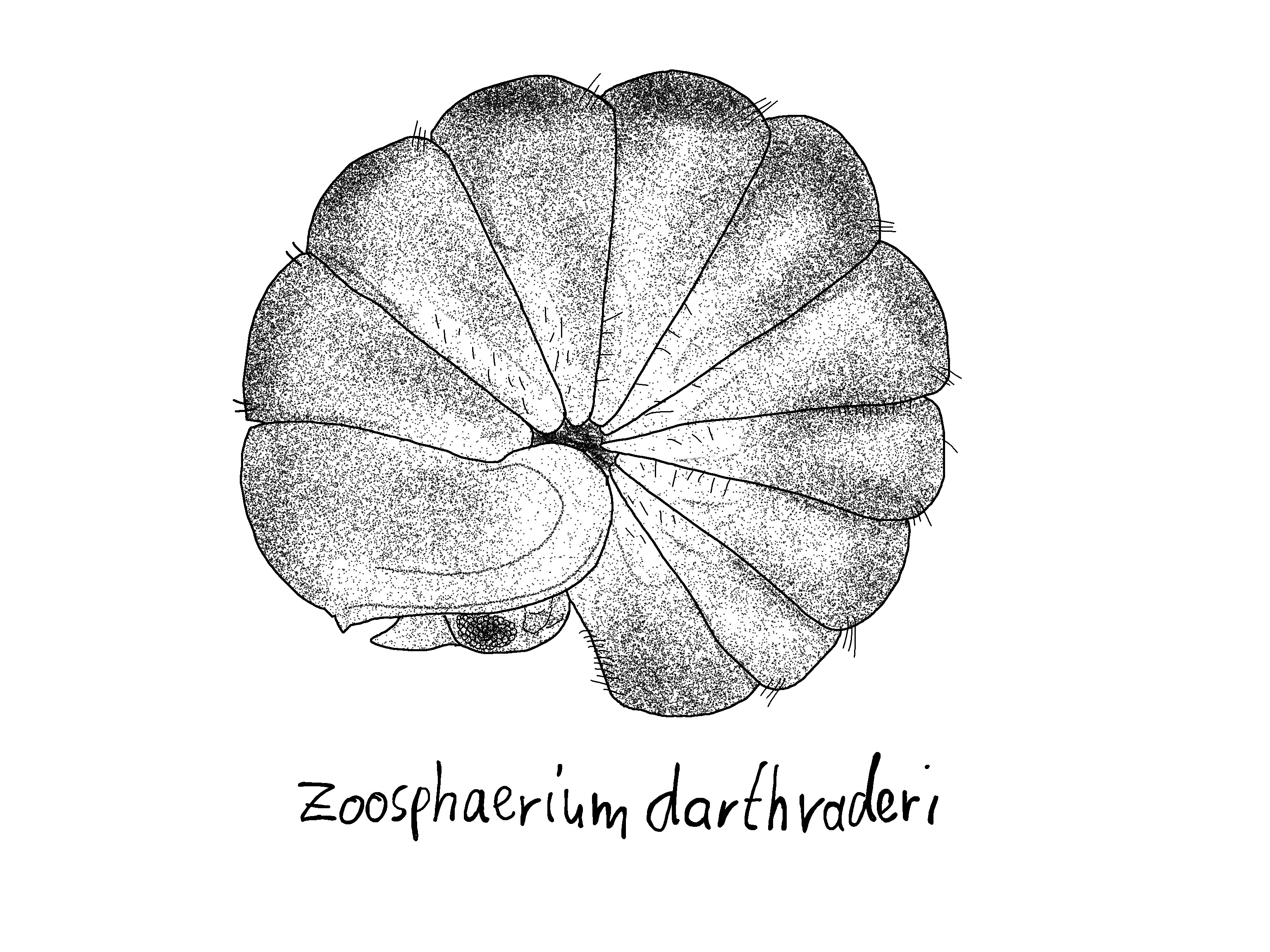

Conservation status
- Critically Endangered (IUCN 3.1)

Scientific classification
- Kingdom: Animalia
- Phylum: Arthropoda
- Subphylum: Myriapoda
- Class: Diplopoda
- Order: Sphaerotheriida
- Family: Arthrosphaeridae
- Genus: Zoosphaerium
- Species: Z. darthvaderi

Binomial name
- Zoosphaerium darthvaderi Wesener & Bespalova, 2010

= Zoosphaerium darthvaderi =

Species of millipede

Zoosphaerium darthvaderi, also known as the Darth Vader giant pill millipede, is a species of giant pill millipede endemic to the island state of Madagascar. It is named after the Star Wars character Darth Vader. The millipede is restricted to the Ambohitantely Reserve and is considered an extremely endangered species.

== History and classification ==
The holotype and three immature male paratypes of Zoosphaerium darthvaderi were collected via pitfall traps in an area of disturbed transitional mossy forest at an elevation of 1,450 m (4,760 ft). The forested region is 24 km (15 mi) northeast of Ankazobe in Antananarivo Province, Madagascar, and the millipedes were collected in 1997 and subsequently accessioned into the entomology collections of the Field Museum of Natural History in Chicago. They were not fully examined and described until a team of entomologists from the Field Museum and Mount Holyoke College published the type description in 2010 along with the descriptions of four other species in the genus Zoosphaerium. They coined the specific epithet darthvaderi after Darth Vader, a character from the movie franchise Star Wars. The name was attributed to the millipede's anal shield, which has a "pronounced bell shape" that the researchers considered to strongly resemble Vader's helmet in the films.

Z. darthvaderi is of uncertain species-group placement within Zoosphaerium, having telopods that include features seen in differing species groups. The frontal telopods are very similar to those in the neptunus species group, but the rear telopods are much closer in structure to the coquerelianum species group. This raises questions about the monophyly of the described species groups and the need for more study of the genus. The species is considered an example of invertebrate island gigantism.

== Description ==
Z. darthvaderi is a mostly smooth and small pill millipede with rear tergites which are free from setae. The holotype male is 20.8 mm (13/16 in) long and bears a 9.4 mm (3/8 in) wide by 5.2 mm (13/64 in) tall thoracic shield. The overall coloration of the body is of brown tones, although the color may have been altered somewhat during the preservation process in alcohol. Both the head and collum are a dark leafy green, while the antennae and legs are a lighter jade green. The legs are notably yellow-tipped. The body is a greenish brown, grading onto ochre along the edges of the tergites. Males also have a bell-shaped anal shield, with five or six teeth, that is a darker solid brown than the body. The collum is mostly smooth, with only scattered hairs along the edges. On the head, the eyes are composed of between 65 and 70 ocelli, and the antennae are six-segmented. Antennomeres 1 through 3 have hardened teeth along the sides while antennomere 6 has an apical disc hosting 20 sensory cones.

Females of the species have not been found and described.

== Threats ==
The species is restricted to the Ambohitantely Reserve, an area of transitional forest in central Madagascar. Z. darthvaderi does not migrate, and is heavily threatened by rapid habitat loss through agriculture. Fragmented forest habitats, already endangered, are shrinking as a result of slash-and-burn agriculture and fire clearing for the creation of pasture land. The remaining forest fragments that are home to the millipede are separated by regions unfit for the species's adaptations, separating populations from one another. Consequently, the population of this millipede is likewise fragmented, and with no known individuals being bred in captivity the species's risk of extinction is extreme.
