= Miary Lamatihy =

- Location in Madagascar
- Coordinates: 22°52′S 44°28′E
- Country: Madagascar
- Region: Atsimo-Andrefana
- District: Sakaraha
- Elevation: 393 m (1,289 ft)

Population (2001)
  - Total: 3,000
- Time zone: UTC3 (EAT)

Miary Lamatihy is a town and commune (Malagasy: kaominina) in Madagascar. It belongs to the district of Sakaraha, which is a part of Atsimo-Andrefana Region. The population of the commune was estimated to be approximately 3,000 in 2001 commune census.

Only primary schooling is available. The majority 70% of the population of the commune are farmers, while an additional 25% receives their livelihood from raising livestock. The most important crop is cotton, while other important products are cassava, lima beans and rice. Services provide employment for 5% of the population.
