= Mitsinjo, Sakaraha =

Mitsinjo
- Location in Madagascar
- Country: Madagascar
- Region: Atsimo-Andrefana
- District: Sakaraha

Government
  - Mayor: MONJA Dekonty

Population (2018)Census
  - Total: 4,168
- Time zone: UTC3 (EAT)
- Postal code: 620

Mitsinjo is a rural municipality in western Madagascar. It belongs to the district of Sakaraha, which is a part of Atsimo-Andrefana. The population of the municipality was 4168 in 2019.
