= Andalamasina Vineta =

- Location in Madagascar
- Coordinates: 23°1′S 44°16′E
- Country: Madagascar
- Region: Atsimo-Andrefana
- District: Sakaraha
- Elevation: 440 m (1,440 ft)

Population (2001)
  - Total: 4,000
- Time zone: UTC3 (EAT)

Andalamasina Vineta is a town and commune (Malagasy: kaominina) in Madagascar. It belongs to the district of Sakaraha, which is a part of Atsimo-Andrefana Region. The population of the commune was estimated to be approximately 4,000 in 2001 commune census.

Only primary schooling is available. The majority 60% of the population of the commune are farmers, while an additional 20% receives their livelihood from raising livestock. The most important crop is cotton, while other important products are maize and cassava. Industry and services provide employment for 5% and 10% of the population, respectively. Additionally fishing employs 5% of the population.
