= Amboronabo =

- Location in Madagascar
- Coordinates: 22°40′S 44°24′E
- Country: Madagascar
- Region: Atsimo-Andrefana
- District: Sakaraha

Government
  - Mayor: Nomenjanary Ralaimanga Ratovoson
- Elevation: 472 m (1,549 ft)

Population (2001)
  - Total: 9,000
- Time zone: UTC3 (EAT)

Amboronabo is a town and commune (Malagasy: kaominina) in Madagascar. It belongs to the district of Sakaraha, which is a part of Atsimo-Andrefana Region. The population of the commune was estimated to be approximately 9,000 in 2001 commune census.

Only primary schooling is available. The majority 50% of the population of the commune are farmers, while an additional 49% receives their livelihood from raising livestock. The most important crop is bananas, while other important products are cassava and onions. Services provide employment for 1% of the population.
