= Mihavatsy =

- Location in Madagascar
- Coordinates: 22°54′S 44°8′E
- Country: Madagascar
- Region: Atsimo-Andrefana
- District: Sakaraha
- Elevation: 480 m (1,570 ft)

Population (2001)
  - Total: 3,000
- Time zone: UTC3 (EAT)

Mihavatsy is a town and commune (Malagasy: kaominina) in Madagascar. It belongs to the district of Sakaraha, which is a part of Atsimo-Andrefana Region. The population of the commune was estimated to be approximately 3,000 in 2001 commune census.

Only primary schooling is available. The majority 55% of the population of the commune are farmers, while an additional 44% receives their livelihood from raising livestock. The most important crop is cassava, while other important products are maize and taro. Services provide employment for 1% of the population.
