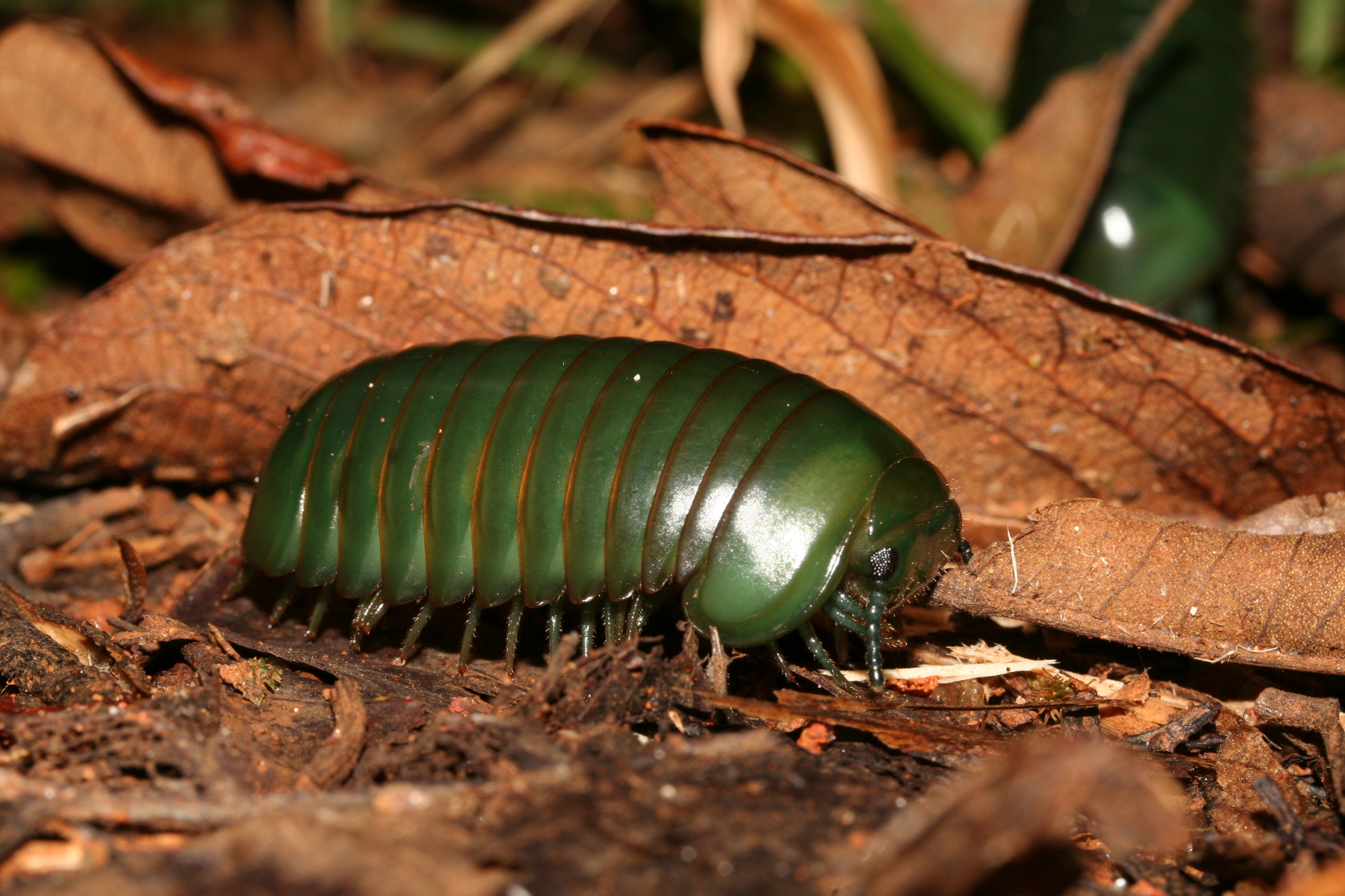

Conservation status
- Least Concern (IUCN 3.1)

Scientific classification
- Kingdom: Animalia
- Phylum: Arthropoda
- Subphylum: Myriapoda
- Class: Diplopoda
- Order: Sphaerotheriida
- Family: Arthrosphaeridae
- Genus: Zoosphaerium
- Species: Z. neptunus

Binomial name
- Zoosphaerium neptunus (Butler 1872)
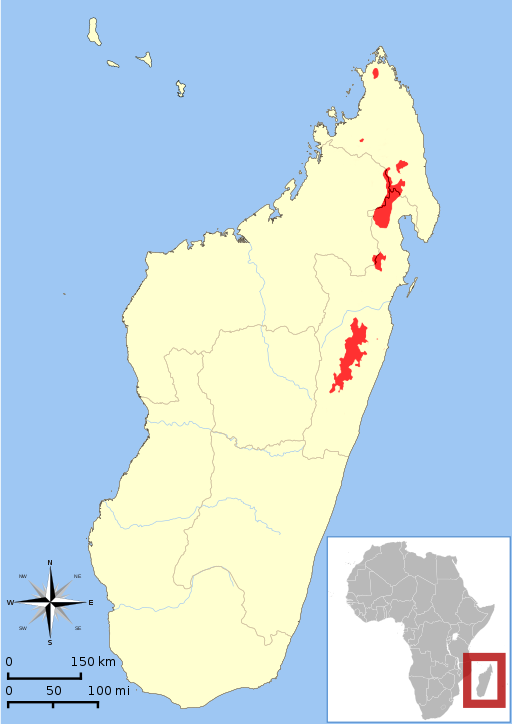
- Distribution of Zoosphaerium neptunus

Synonyms
- Sphaerotherium digitale De Saussure & Zehntner, 1902; Sphaerotherium neptunus Butler, 1872; Sphaerotherium pygidiale Saussure & Zehntner, 1897; Zoosphaerium digitale (De Saussure & Zehntner, 1902)

= Zoosphaerium neptunus =

Species of millipede

Zoosphaerium neptunus, also known as the emerald green giant pill millipede, is a species of pill millipede in the family Arthrosphaeridae. This species is shiny green and the largest pill millipede known, with some females reaching 90 mm (3.5 inches) in length. An adult female of this size can roll into a ball the size of a baseball. This millipede is endemic to Madagascar, and the large size of this species is an example of island gigantism. This millipede has been observed in large aggregations of thousands of specimens and is the only species in the order Sphaerotheriida known to form such swarms.

== Taxonomy ==
This species was first described in 1872 under the name Sphaerotherium neptunus by the English zoologist Arthur G. Butler. In 1895, the British zoologist Reginald I. Pocock proposed the genus Zoosphaerium and designated Z. neptunus as the type species for this new genus. In 2008, the German zoologists Thomas Wesener and Johann-Wolfgang Wägele redescribed this species and deemed Sphaerotherium digitale and S. pygidale to be junior synonyms of Z. neptunus.

== Description ==
Zoosphaerium neptunus is a large species of pill millipede that exhibits a marked sexual dimorphism in size. Males reach about 45 mm (1.8 inches) in length, whereas females can reach up to 90 mm (3.5 inches) in length. The tergites ranges from a shiny light green to a darker olive green. The head, antennae, and legs are also greenish. Each tergite features a narrow brown line along the posterior margin. Specimens preserved in alcohol may darken, turning light brown.

As in other species of giant pill millipedes, adults of this species feature twelve tergites and an anal shield, six joints on each antenna, 21 pairs of legs in females, and 23 leg pairs in males, including the last two pairs, which become telopods, modified for use in reproduction. The tergites in this species are smooth and hairless. The head features more than 80 ocelli. The sixth joint on each antenna is the longest and bears a disc at the tip with 18 to 26 sensory cones. The mandible features six rows of pectinate lamellae, and the ventral side of the gnathochilarium features numerous bristles. The first segment behind the head (collum) has long isolated hairs along the anterior margin and a row of even more strongly isolated hairs along the posterior margin.

=== Male traits ===
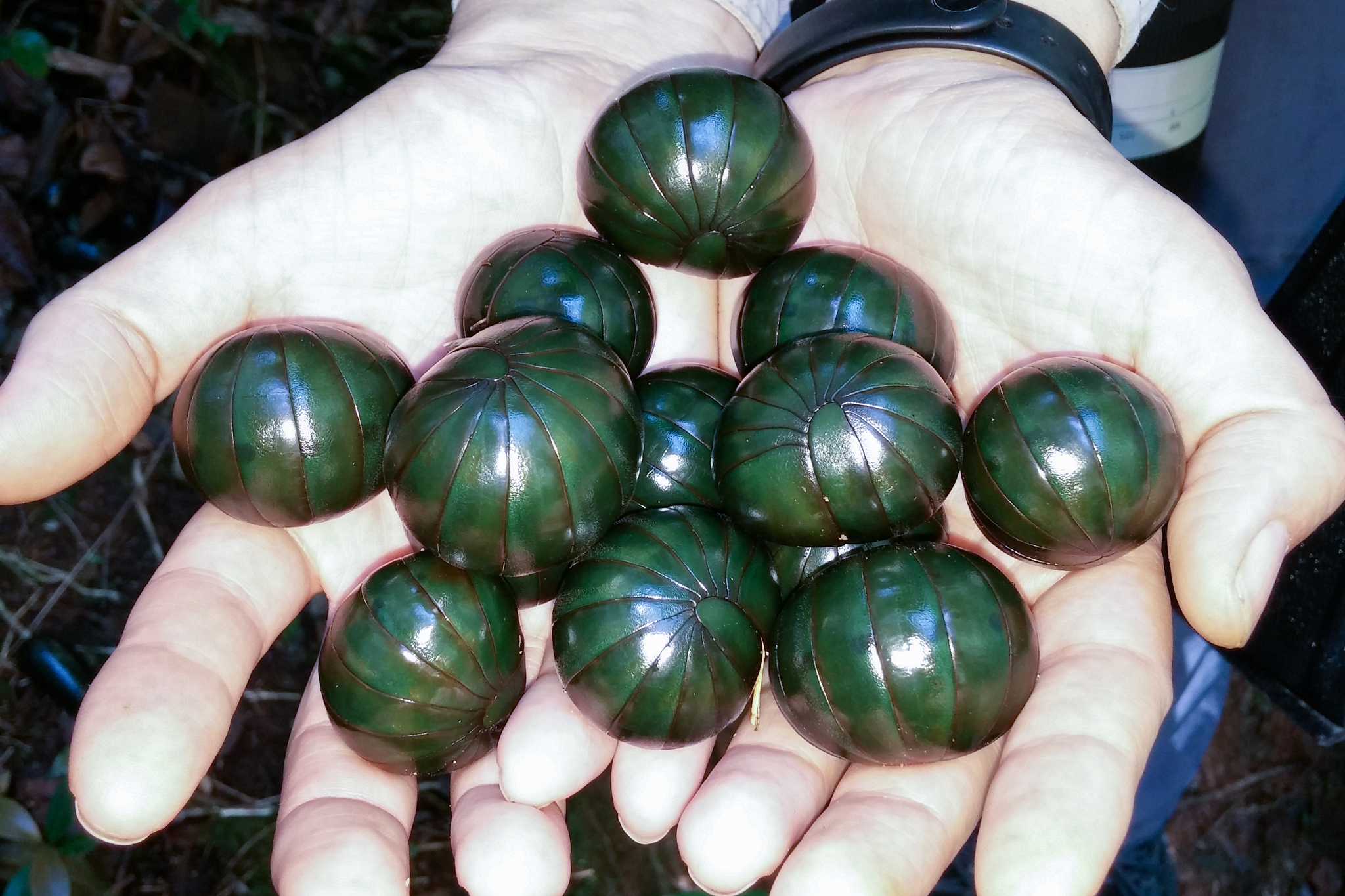
Female Zoosphaerium neptunus are significantly larger than the males.

Males can reach 45.5 mm in length, with the thoracic shield reaching 21.5 mm in width and 11.35 mm in height. The anal shield in males is strongly bell-shaped and covered laterally with numerous small round pits, some of which support a short hair. The first joint on the anterior telopods features a stridulation harp and one stridulation rib. The second joint on the anterior telopods features a process projecting along the third joint and reaching about half to three-fifths of the length of the third joint. The third joint of the posterior telopods is long and straight and becomes slimmer towards a stout tip.

=== Female traits ===
Females can reach 90 mm in length and 45.85 mm in width. The vulva of females is large, covering more than two-thirds of the coxa. The operculum is elongated, protruding up to the apical edge of the coxa. The apical margin of the operculum is notched in the middle and features two rounded tips, with the lateral tip protruding twice as far as the internal tip. The subanal plate in females features a structure like a washboard with two or three well developed stridulation ribs on each side.

== Distribution and ecology ==
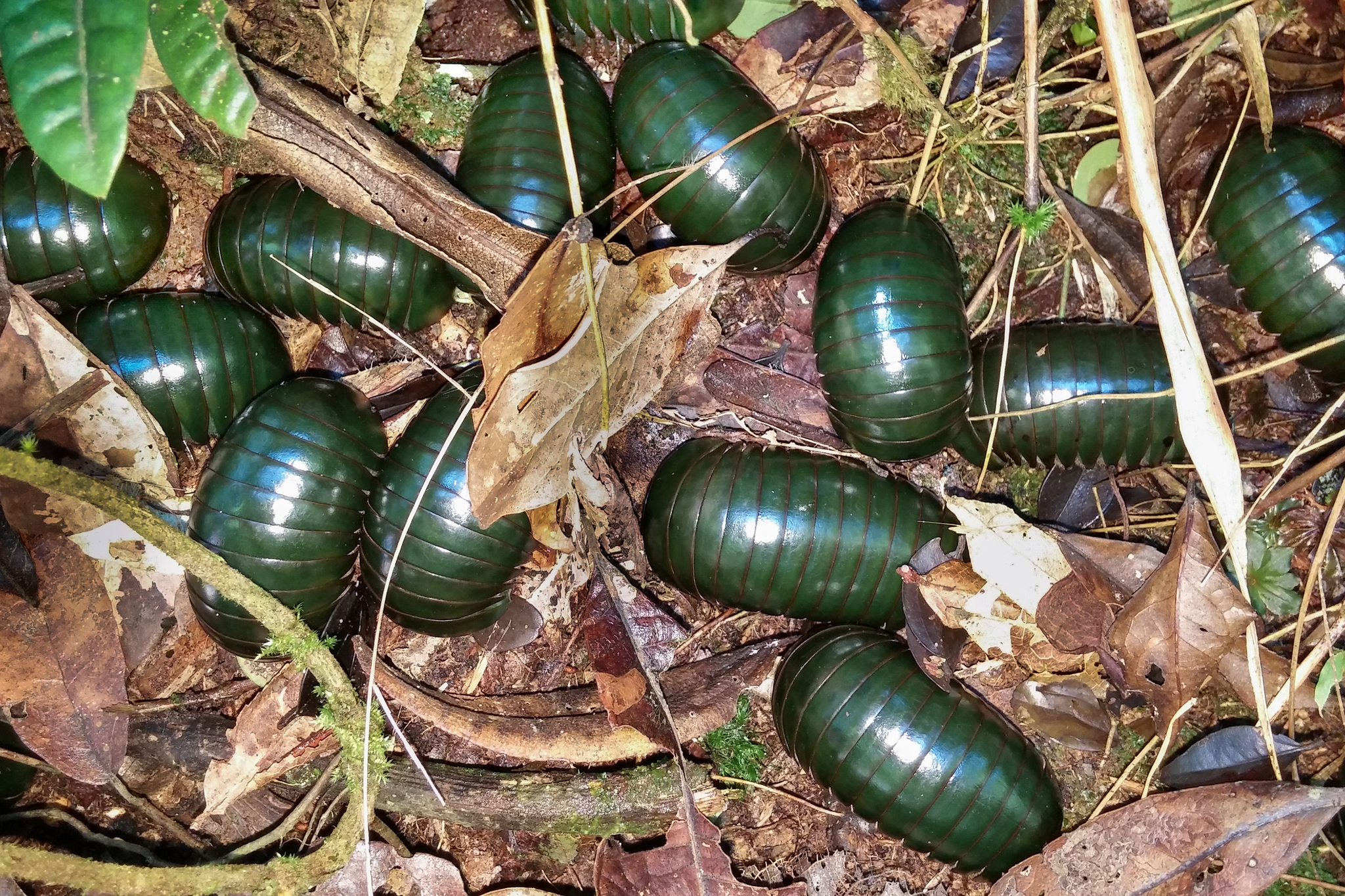
A swarm of Zoosphaerium neptunus.

Zoosphaerium neptunus is an endemic species found only in Madagascar, mainly in the northern part of the island. This species is one of the few widely distributed giant pill millipedes on the island. This millipede can be found in rainforest habitats, from eastern lowland forest to center elevation forest at 850 meters above sea level. Like other pill millipedes, this species is a detritivore, feeding on decaying organic matter, especially dead leaves. This species has a lifespan of three to four years.

Although giant pill millipedes are rarely found in large numbers in Madagascar, the species Z. neptunus is known to form swarms, which can include tens of thousands of millipedes. These swarms can be as large as 1,100 meters long and from three to ten meters wide. In these swarms, most millipedes have been observed slowly walking, all in the same direction, seemingly oblivious to their surroundings, with some even walking into water and drowning. Each swarm involves millipedes of similar size, but juveniles as well as mature adults can form swarms. Authorities suspect that these millipedes form such swarms as a defense strategy, increasing the chances of surviving predation.

== Conservation ==
Given a wide distribution that includes some protected areas, this species does not face the threat of extinction. This millipede has lost some of its habitat, however, as a result of forest destruction. Millipedes that form swarms as part of their life cycle, like Z. neptunus, require larger intact areas, which may be scarce in many parts of Madagascar. Obstacles such as roads could prove deadly for swarms and might affect the survival of this species.

Another potential threat to this species is collection for the pet trade. Demand for this species is strong in Europe, North America, and Japan. Giant pill millipedes from Madagascar are known to have a short lifespan in captivity, facing inappropriate environmental conditions in terraria and often starving to death as a result of an improper diet. Captive populations tend to have a scarcity of males, possibly because their smaller size renders them less desirable to collectors compared to the larger females. Large numbers of Z. neptunus could be harvested during swarming, and this risk may require proper management of harvests to protect the survival of a population in a given area.
