= Miary Taheza =

- Location in Madagascar
- Coordinates: 23°8′S 44°37′E
- Country: Madagascar
- Region: Atsimo-Andrefana
- District: Sakaraha
- Elevation: 401 m (1,316 ft)

Population (2001)
  - Total: 10,000
- Time zone: UTC3 (EAT)

Miary Taheza is a town and commune (Malagasy: kaominina) in Madagascar. It belongs to the district of Sakaraha, which is a part of Atsimo-Andrefana Region. The population of the commune was estimated to be approximately 10,000 in 2001 commune census.

Only primary schooling is available. The majority 60% of the population of the commune are farmers, while an additional 30% receives their livelihood from raising livestock. The most important crops are rice and cassava; also maize is an important agricultural product. Services provide employment for 10% of the population.
