= Ambinany =

- Location in Madagascar
- Coordinates: 22°37′S 44°51′E
- Country: Madagascar
- Region: Atsimo-Andrefana
- District: Sakaraha
- Elevation: 629 m (2,064 ft)

Population (2001)
  - Total: 5,000
- Time zone: UTC3 (EAT)

Ambinany is a town and commune (Malagasy: kaominina) in Madagascar. It belongs to the district of Sakaraha, which is a part of Atsimo-Andrefana Region. The population of the commune was estimated to be approximately 5,000 in 2001 commune census.

Primary and junior level secondary education are available in town. The majority 55% of the population of the commune are farmers, while an additional 43% receives their livelihood from raising livestock. The most important crop is rice, while other important products are maize and cassava. Services provide employment for 1% of the population. Additionally fishing employs 1% of the population.
