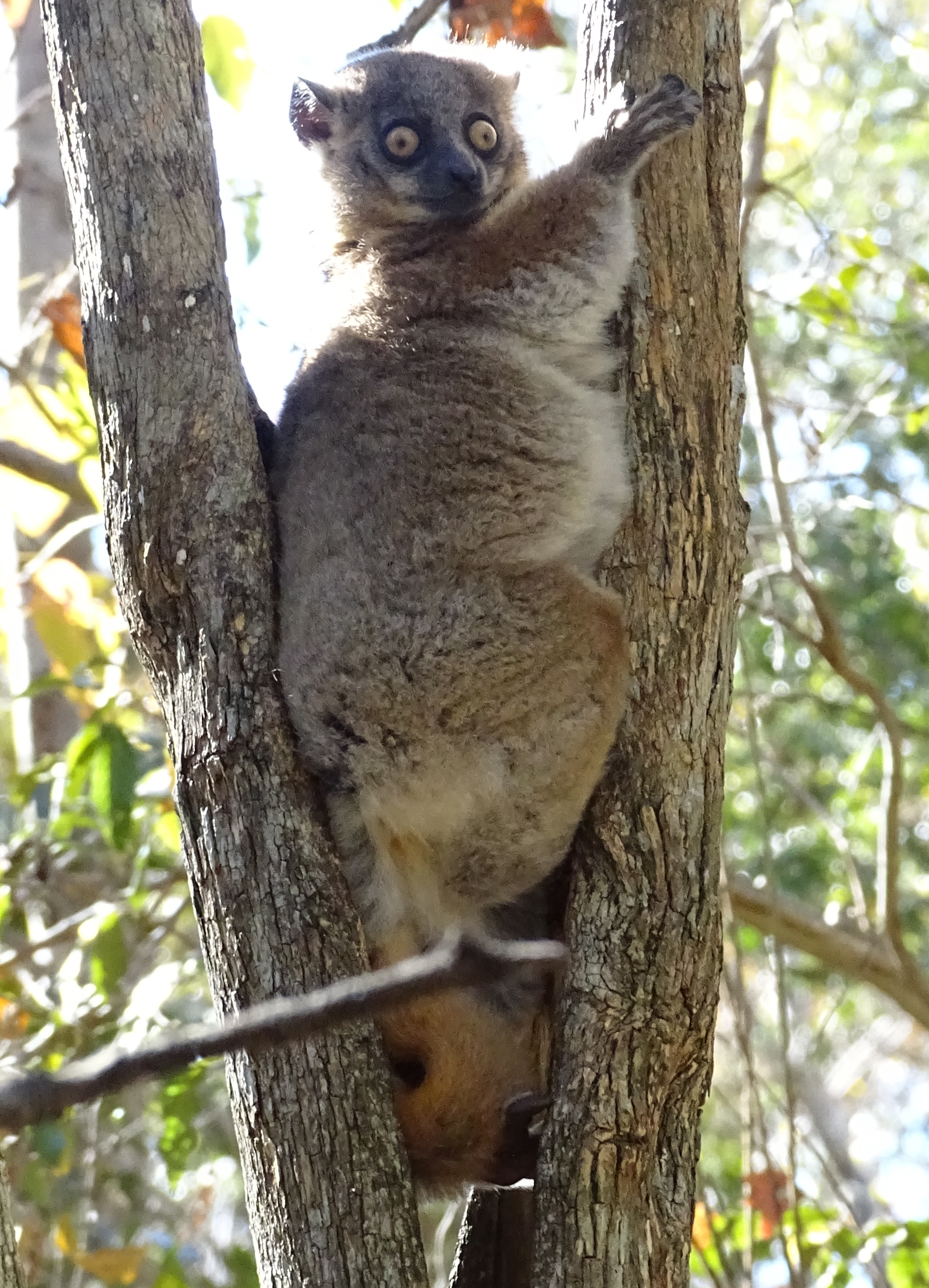

Conservation status
- Endangered (IUCN 3.1)
- CITES Appendix I (CITES)

Scientific classification
- Kingdom: Animalia
- Phylum: Chordata
- Class: Mammalia
- Order: Primates
- Suborder: Strepsirrhini
- Family: Lepilemuridae
- Genus: Lepilemur
- Species: L. hubbardorum

Binomial name
- Lepilemur hubbardorum Louis et al., 2006
- Distribution of L. hubbardorum

= Hubbard's sportive lemur =

Species of mammal

Hubbard's sportive lemur (Lepilemur hubbardorum), or the Zombitse sportive lemur, is a sportive lemur endemic to Madagascar. It has total length of about 51 to 59 cm (20 to 23 in), of which 23–25 cm (9.1–9.8 in) are tail. Hubbard's sportive lemur is found north of the Onilahy River and south of the Mangoky River in Zombitse-Vohibasia National Park in southwestern Madagascar, living in dry transitional forests. The species listed as endangered by the International Union for Conservation of Nature (IUCN) and is threatened by habitat loss and degradation, forest fires, and unsustainable levels of hunting.

Hubbard's sportive lemur was described as a new species in 2006 when mitochondrial DNA sequencing showed it was significantly different from the red-tailed sportive lemur. Originally named L. hubbardi, the name was found to be incorrectly formed and was corrected to L. hubbardorum in 2009.

A survey conducted over an 18 night period recorded 234 sightings of Hubbard's sportive lemur in the Zombitse-Vohibasia National Park. Data extrapolated from this survey indicates 16,500–18,000 individuals within the park.

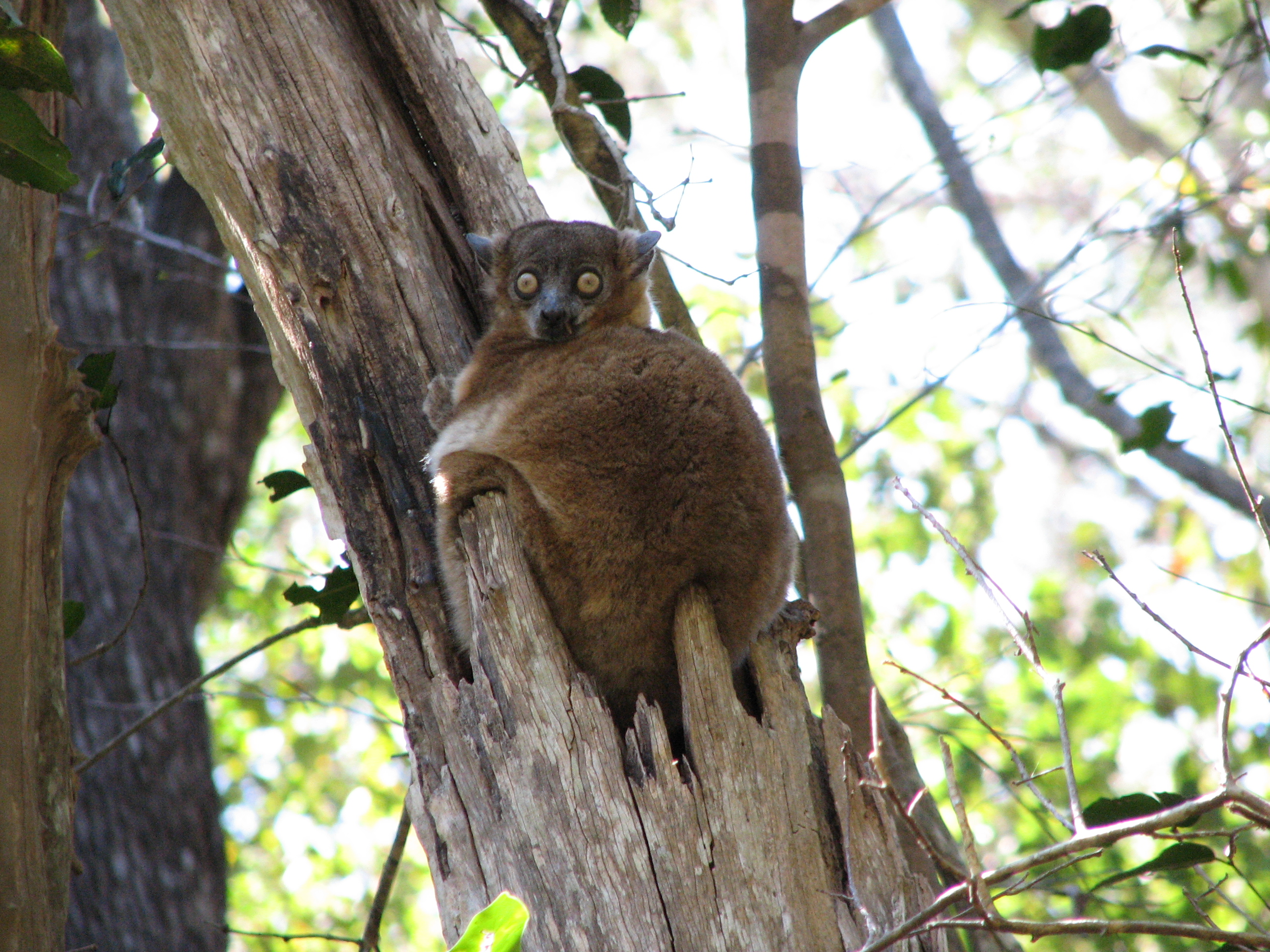
Hubbard's sportive lemur
