= Sakaraha =

Coordinates: 22°55′0″S 44°32′59″E

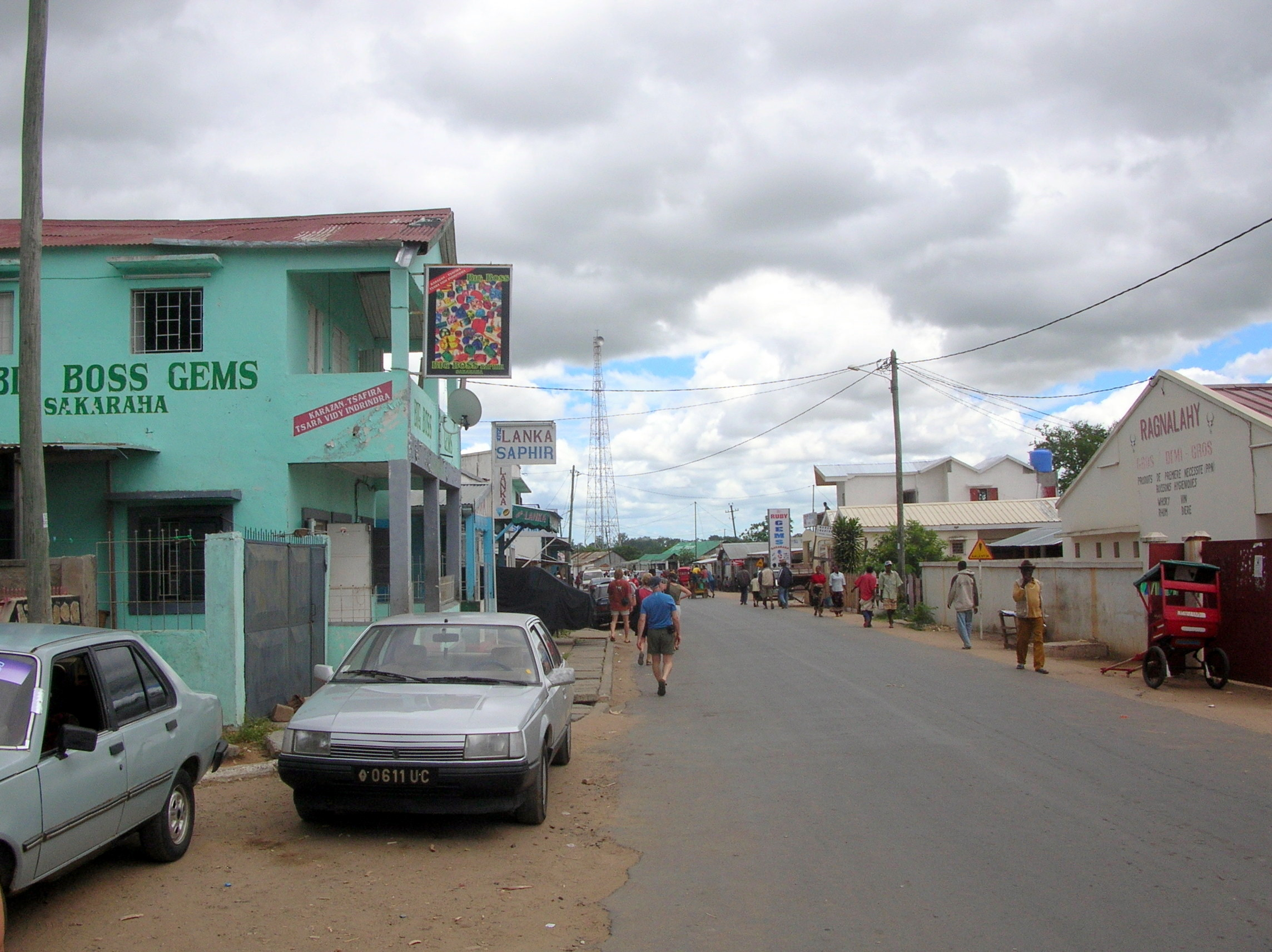

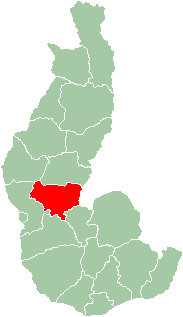
- Map of former Toliara Province showing the location of Sakaraha (red).
- Country: Madagascar
- Region: Atsimo-Andrefana
- District: Sakaraha

Population (2018)Census
  - Total: 31,183
- Postal code: 620

Sakaraha is a rural municipality in Atsimo-Andrefana Region, south-western Madagascar. It has a population of 31,183 in 2018.

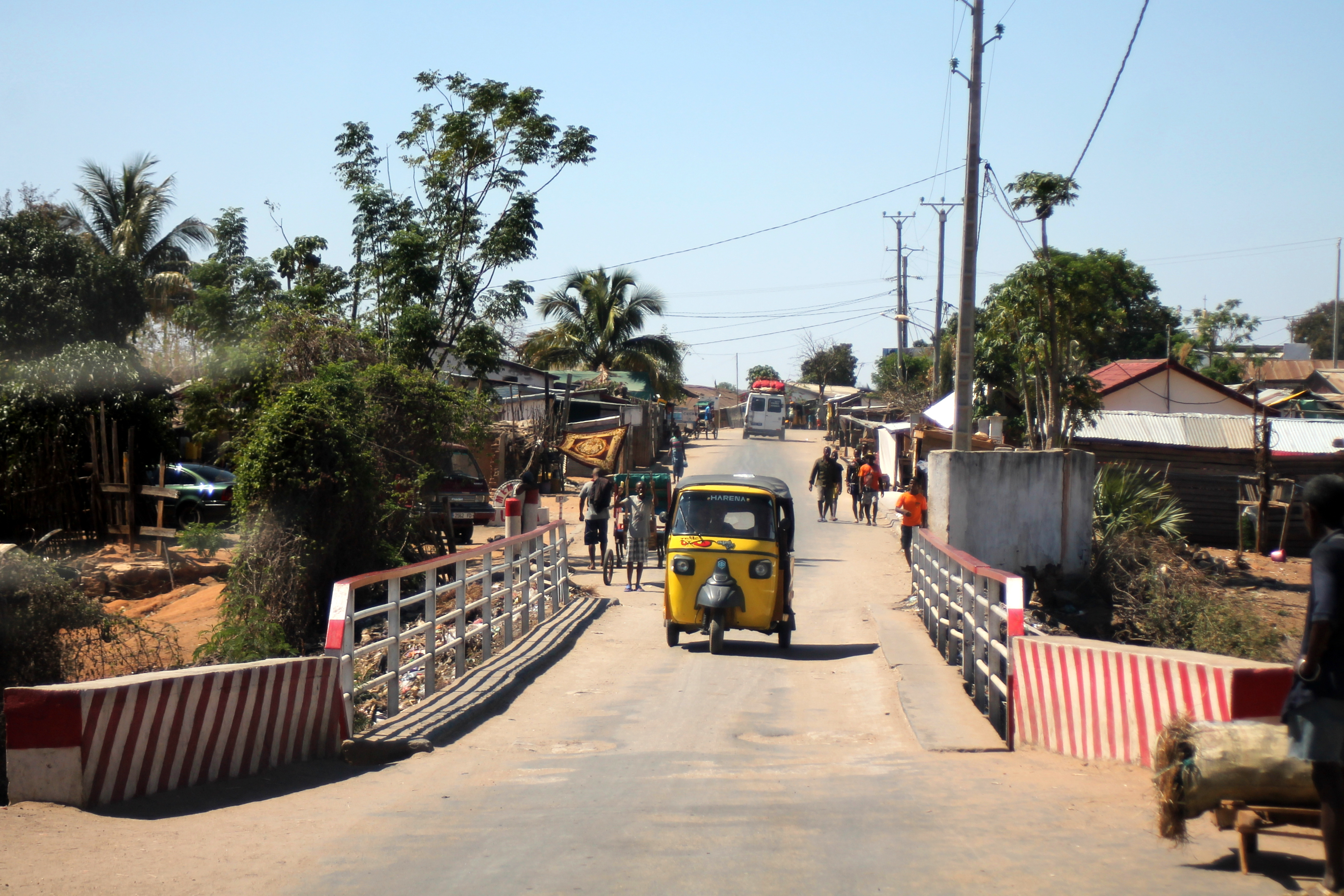
Sakaraha

== Geography ==
Sakaraha is situated along route nationale No. 7 (Tuléar-Fianarantsoa) at 134 km from Tuléar, 64 km from Andranovory and 84 km from Ilakaka. It is situated at the Zombitse-Vohibasia National Park.

== Economy ==
Mining: there are sapphires found in the town of Sakaraha.

Natural gas was discovered near Sakaraha by Madagascar Southern Petroleum Company (MSCP) in 2011. There are also some oil deposits near Sakaraha but there is no commercial exploration.

On 31 January 2007, Saudi terrorist Mohammed Jamal Khalifa was murdered by 25 to 30 armed men while visiting a gemstone mine he owned in Sakamilko, near the town of Sakaraha. He had recently called in local police to evict people who had been working the gem mine in his absence. Though all his belongings had been stolen there is some conjecture that the death was politically motivated. Khalifa's family came to believe that he was assassinated by operators from the Joint Special Operations Command.
