= Zombitse-Vohibasia National Park =

National Park in Madagascar

- IUCN category II (national park)
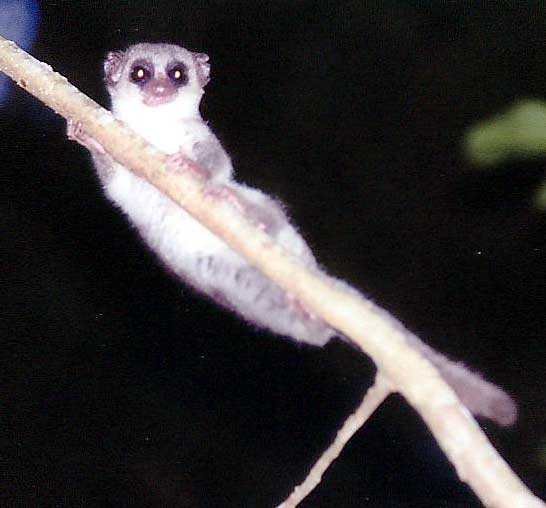
- 'Fat-tailed dwarf lemur'

- Location within Madagascar
- Location: Atsimo-Andrefana, Madagascar
- Nearest city: Sakaraha, Tulear
- Coordinates: 22°50′S 44°41′E
- Area: 363.08 km^{2} (140.19 sq mi)
- Established: First protected 1962, parcels added 18 December 1997, upgraded to National Park 2002
- Governing body: Madagascar National Parks Association
- Website: https://www.parcs-madagascar.com/parcs/zombitse.php

Zombitse-Vohibasia is a national park in the Atsimo-Andrefana region of south-west Madagascar. It is 147 kilometres (91 mi) north-east of the town of Toliara on the National road 7.

The nearest airport is in Toliara and the office is at Sakaraha 10 kilometres (6.2 mi) from the park entrance. The park covers a surface of 36,308 hectares (89,720 acres) on three sites; the forest of Zombitse (16,845 hectares (41,620 acres)) and the sites of Isoky Vohimena (3,293 hectares (8,140 acres)) and Vohibasia (16,170 hectares (40,000 acres)). The Bara people and Mahafaly people are the main ethnic groups in the area.

== History and significance ==
The park is made up of three separate sections. The Zombitse forest was first set aside as a protected area in 1962, the Vohibasia and Isoky-Vohimena forests were added in 1997 and the full site formally established as a National Park in 2002. The national park falls within the ecoregion classified as Madagascar succulent woodlands, an ecoregion that is known for high local endemicity and that is transitional between the spiny thicket and the dry deciduous woodland ecoregions. The ecoregion is described as a mosaic of succulent plants and dry deciduous forest and is assessed as Critical/Endangered. Several locally endemic species such as the endangered Hubbard's or Zombitse sportive lemur (Lepilemur hubbardorum) are known only from the Zombitse-Vohibasia National Park area. The park meets the Birdlife International criteria as an Important Bird Area as a "biological reservoir of primary importance, due to its location straddling the western and southern domains of Madagascar".

== Climate ==
Information from the nearest weather station (Sakaraha), about 10 km away, gives an average temperature of 23.4 °C, with January the hottest month (averaging 26.5 °C) and July the coldest (averaging 18.2 °C). The climate is relatively dry, with an average of 724 mm of rain per year. The rainy season runs from November through to March; the dry season from April to October. The warmest months are generally the wettest; January averaging 187 mm of rain and July averaging 4 mm.

== Geography ==
The park includes the forests of Zombitse, Vohibasia and Isoky-Vohimena in three non-contiguous parcels. The Zombitse forest straddles Hwy RN7; the Vohibasia forest is to the northwest of Zombitse, and the Isoky-Vohimena forest is set between the two. The Isalo massif and Isalo National Park is 90 kilometres (56 mi) to the east and runs in a north-south direction, and an 820 metres (2,690 ft) high calcareous plateau to the west, runs in a similar north-south direction. The forests of the national park are found between these two uplands; elevation is between 300 m and 825 m. The Zombitse section is on sandstones, the other sections on Jurassic limestone. While there are no watercourses, the springs and small wetlands in the park act as a reservoir, feeding the tributaries of the Teheza and the Fiherenana rivers.

The Zombitse-Vohibasia National Park is crossed by the National road 7 between Ihosy and Toliara (Tulear). The next town is Sakaraha.

== Fauna ==
=== Birds ===
Ninety species of birds are known from the park, including thirty-eight endemic species. One species Appert's tetraka (also known as Appert's greenbul (Xanthomixis apperti) is classified with a conservation status of vulnerable on the IUCN Red List of Threatened Species. "At Zombitse-Vohibasia it is found in the dense underbrush of undisturbed, dry, deciduous forest at about 600-800 m (Morris and Hawkins 1998)."

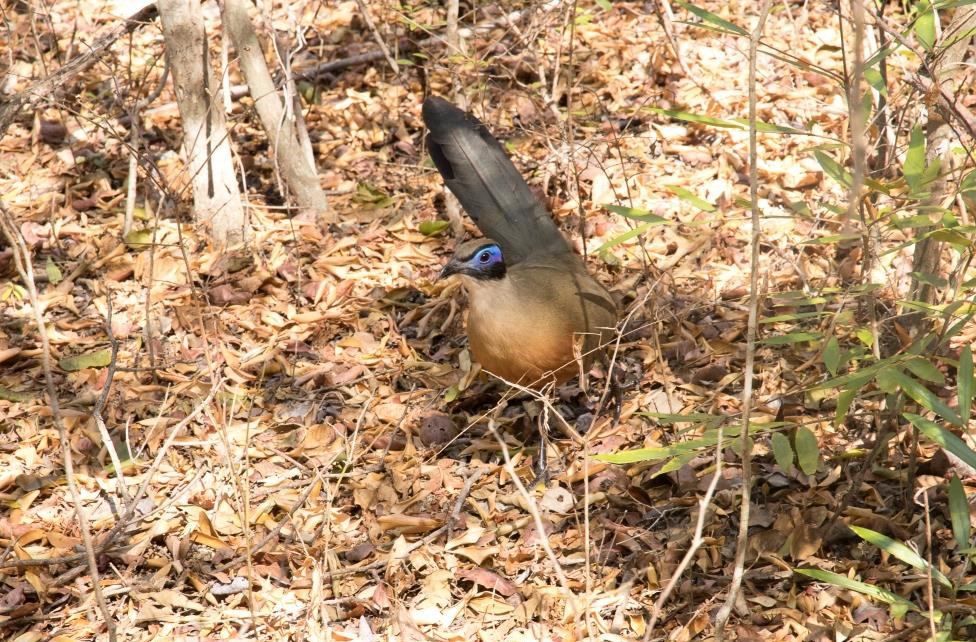
Giant Coua in Zombitse-Vohibasia NP

=== Mammals ===
Twenty species of mammals are recorded in Zombitse-Vohibasia National Park. This includes eight species of lemur, most of which are on the IUCN Red List of Threatened Species.

List of lemur species found in Zombitse-Vohibasia National Park
Viewing time	Species and IUCN category
Day	Ring-tailed lemur (Lemur catta) (Endangered); Verreaux's sifaka (Propithecus verreauxi) (Endangered); Red-fronted lemur (Eulemur rufifrons) (Near Threatened)
Night	Gray mouse lemur (Microcebus murinus); Fat-tailed dwarf lemur (Cheirogaleus medius); Coquerel's giant mouse lemur (Mirza coquereli) (Endangered); Hubbard's sportive lemur (Lepilemur hubbardorum) (Endangered); Pale fork-marked lemur (Phaner pallescens) (Endangered)

Hubbard's sportive lemur is also called the Zombitse Sportive Lemur. This is a species listed on CITES Appendix I and is listed as Endangered by IUCN. Zombitse-Vohibasia National Park is the only protected area where it is known to occur, and populations are thought to be declining. The Nasolo's Shrew Tenrec (Microgale nasoloi) is listed as vulnerable and is known from here and two other sites

Other endemic mammals documented here include Fossa (Cryptoprocta ferox)(VU), robust yellow bat (Scotophilus robustus)(NT), Peters's wrinkle-lipped bat (Mormopterus jugularis)(VU) and bastard big-footed mouse Macrotarsomys bastardi (LC).

=== Amphibians and reptiles ===
Thirty-three species of reptile have been documented here, including Standing's day gecko (Phelsuma standingi)(VU). Eight species of amphibians have also been documented here.

=== Insects ===
An estimated 96% of the species of ants found in Madagascar are endemic, and most (2/3) have yet to be described. Zombitse-Vohibasia National Park is rich in ants, with over 40 species in over 20 genera. Two species of the endemic genus Oncodopus have been documented in the park: Oncodopus zonatus and Oncodopus brongniarti. The Madagascan Flatid Leaf-Bug Flatida rosea has also been found here. Other species with the type locality in the Zombitse-Vohibasia National Park are:

- Lepidoptera
  - Cadorela translucida Griveaud, 1973
  - Filiramifera naumanni Mey, 2019
  - Papilio grosesmithi
  - Acremma macrophaea Hacker, Fiebig & Stadie, 2019
  - Neptidopsis fulgurata (de Boisduval, 1833)

== Flora ==
Botanical inventory of the area now called Zombitse-Vohibasia National Park began with collections by Perrier de la Bâthie in 1910, followed by intensive inventories in the 1950s. Nearly 300 species in eighty-four plant families are present, with two of the families endemic to Madagascar. Only six are non-native species. Most (over 80%) are vascular plants that are endemic to Madagascar. The site has 20 species from the Spurge Family (Euphorbiaceae) and 33 species from the pea family (Fabaceae). There are two species that have been found only in Zombitse-Vohibasia; Ampelosycios bosseri (family Cucurbitaceae), Ivodea trichocarpa (family Rutaceae) and the orchid Grammangis spectabilis Bosser & Morat. Another 23 are rare species, known from 2-5 sites.

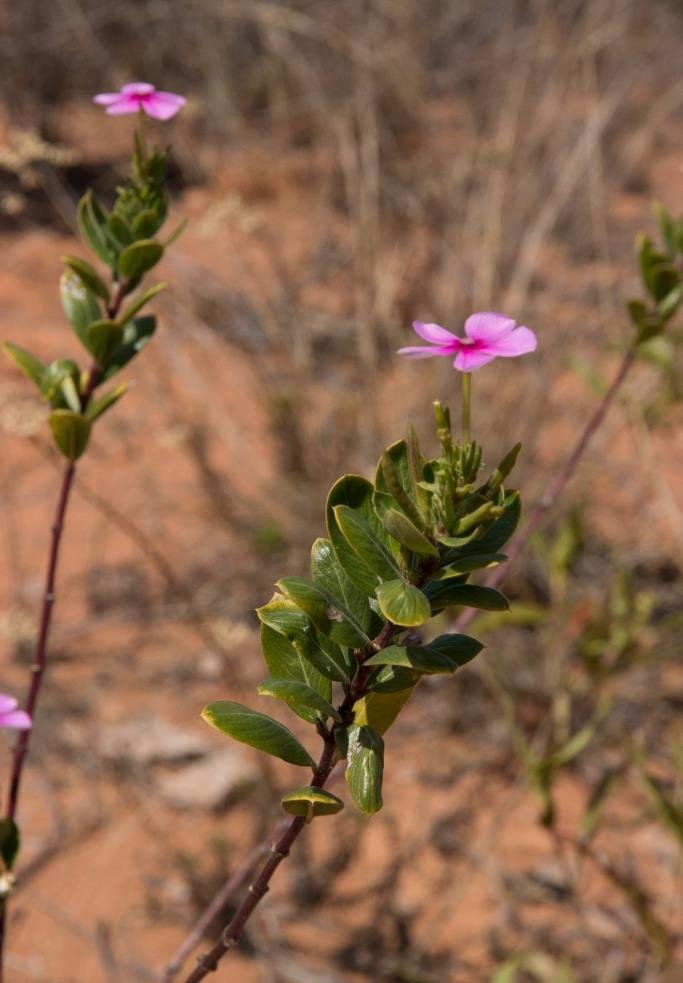
Madagascar periwinkle in Zombitse-Vohibasia NP

== Landscapes ==
The main landscapes found in the park are forests, woodlands, open grasslands and there are also some limited wetland areas. The three sections of Zombitse-Vohibasia National Park have many similarities, although Isoky-Vohimeni sits on the shoulder of the Isalo Massif, and so has some species similarities with Isalo National Park, including Pachypodium rosulatum and several Aloe species.

=== Forests ===
The canopy trees of the forests average 10–16 m tall and are primarily members of the families Euphorbiaceae and Fabaceae (e.g. Pongamiopsis pervilleana). Baobabs (Adansonia za and Adansonia grandidieri) along with other taller trees can be found emerging above the canopy. Beneath the canopy, there is usually a shrub layer made up primarily of woody species with thick, sclerophyllous leaves, including many from the family Euphorbiaceae, as well as species in the families Sapindaceae, Anacardiaceae, and Burseraceae. The Vohibasia section has few understory shrubs but with the rainy season develops a diverse understory, made up largely of annual plants of the family Acanthaceae.

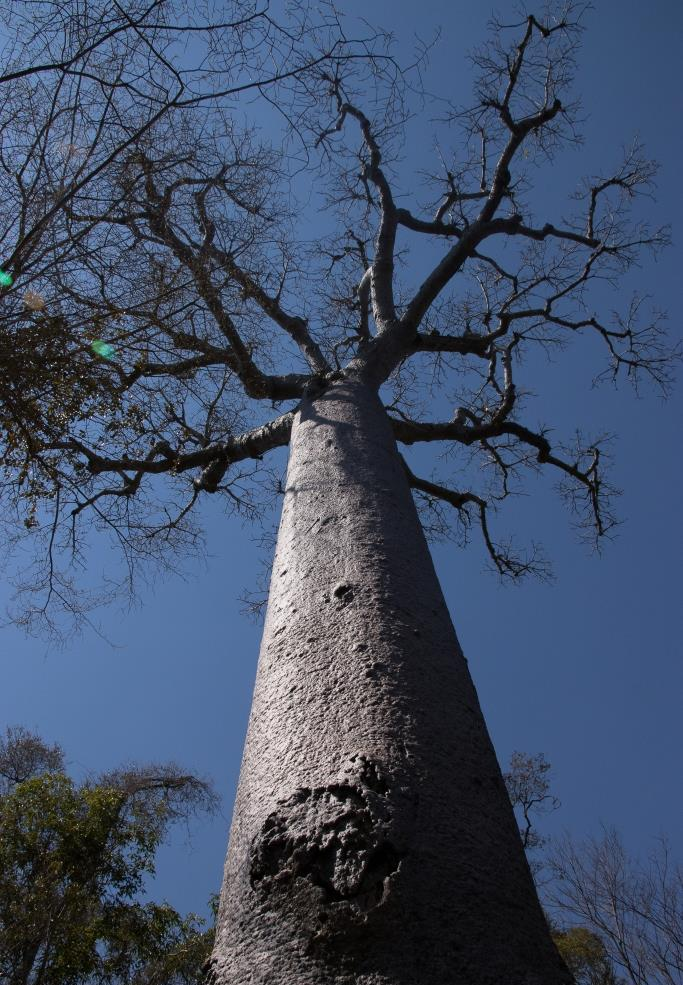
Baobab in Zombitse-Vohibasia NP

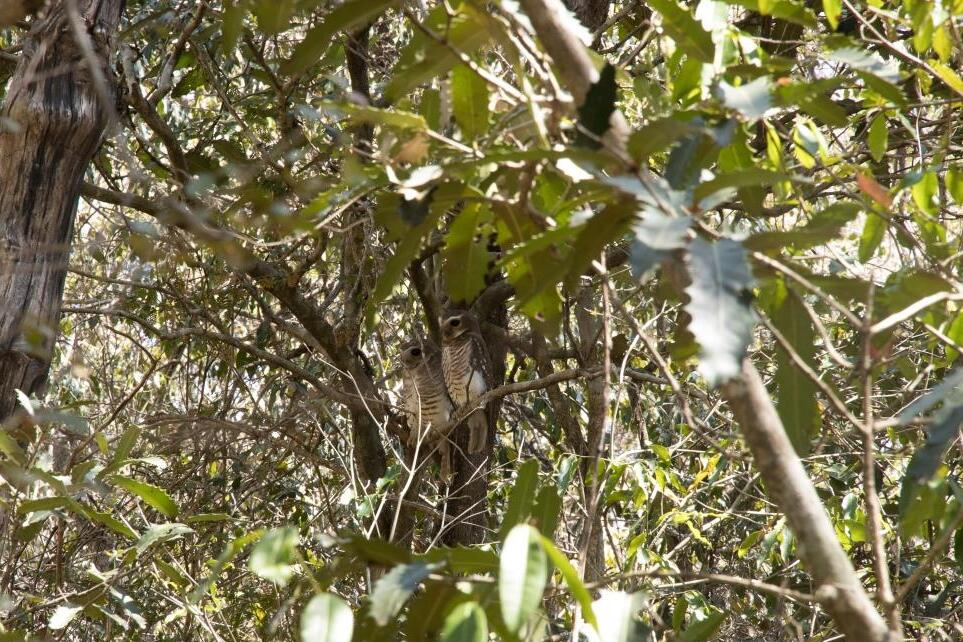
white-browed owl in dense shrub in Zombitse-Vohibasia NP

=== Woodlands and grasslands ===
Woodlands form a transition zone between forest and grassland and have scattered patches of shrubs or small trees such as Dicoma incana, Dalbergia sp., Stereospermum euphoroides, Rhopalocarpus lucidus, Fernandoa madagascariensis, and Diospyros sakalavarum. Woodlands grade into areas of savannah, and into grasslands with numerous grass species. Most of the grasses are native but not endemic species such as Aristida barbicollis.

=== Wetlands ===
Wetlands are not extensive, but Ravenea rivularis (Arecaceae) and Pandanus xerophyta (Pandanaceae) can be found in these moister habitats as well as Cyperus spp. and Scirpus spp. The endemic freshwater aquatic Aponogeton decaryi (near threatened) has also been reported here.

== Conservation ==
Deforestation is a problem within the park with continual losses due to slash and burn agriculture. Forested areas have declined significantly, based on comparisons between 1949 and 1994 aerial photographs and the vegetation is thought to be floristically reduced due to fire, grazing and selective browsing.

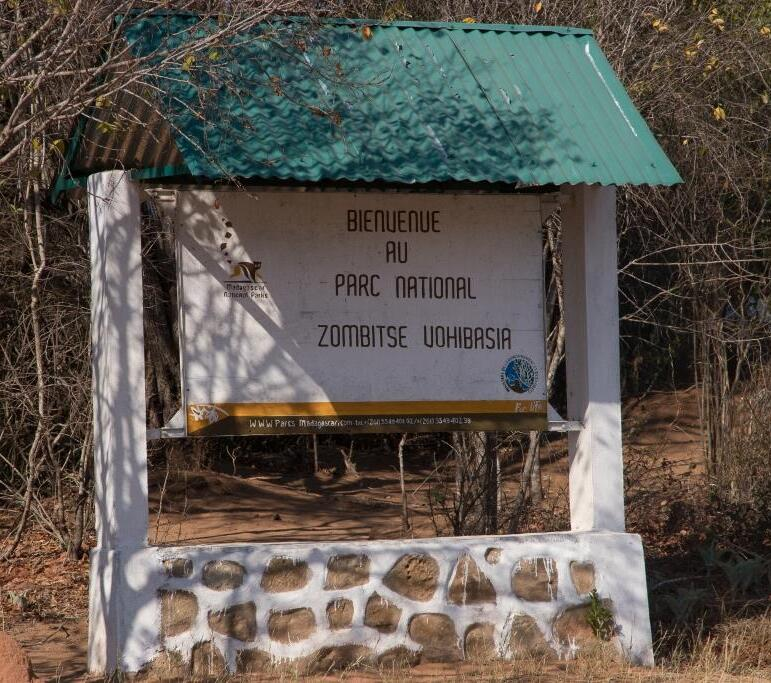
Zombitse-Vohibasia welcome sign

== See also ==
- Atsimo-Andrefana
- List of national parks of Madagascar
