= Ambolofoty =

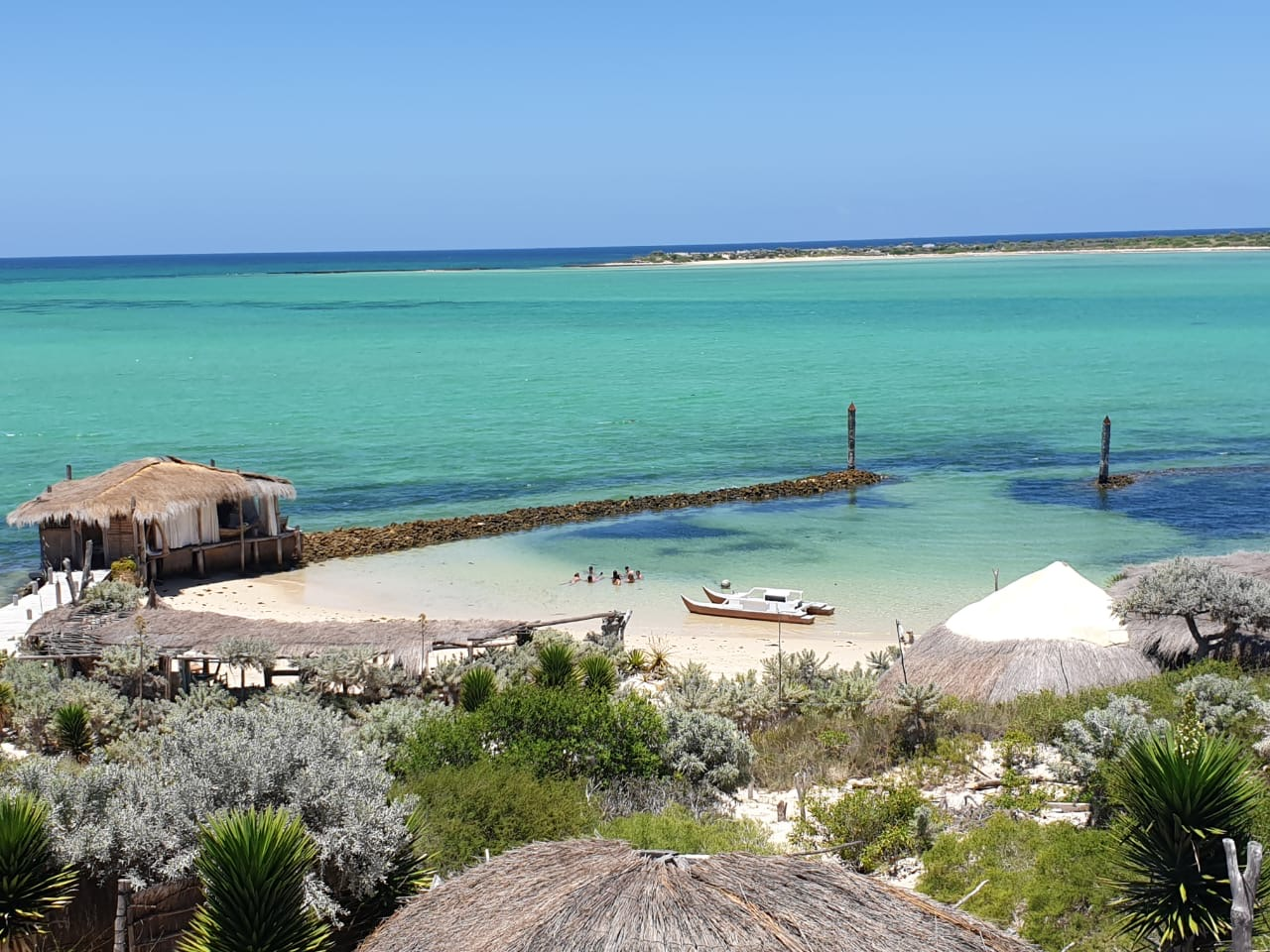
- Anakao, that is part of Ambolofoty

- Location in Madagascar
- Coordinates: 23°32′S 43°52′E
- Country: Madagascar
- Region: Atsimo-Andrefana
- District: Toliara II
- Elevation: 38 m (125 ft)

Population (2001)
  - Total: 8,000
- Time zone: UTC3 (EAT)

Ambolofoty is a town and commune (Malagasy: kaominina) in Madagascar. It belongs to the district of Toliara II, which is a part of Atsimo-Andrefana Region. The town is situated at the Onilahy River. The population of the commune was estimated to be approximately 8,000 in 2001 commune census.

Only primary schooling is available. The majority 66% of the commune population are farmers, while an additional 30% receives their livelihood from raising livestock. The most important crop is sweet potatoes, while other important products are maize, lima beans and cowpeas. Services employ for 2% of the population. Additionally fishing employs 2% of the population.

== See also ==
- Anakao
