= Benenitra District =

Coordinates: 23°27′8″S 45°4′41″E

Benenitra
- District
- Interactive map of Benenitra
- Country: Madagascar

Area
  - Total: 1,831 sq mi (4,741 km^{2})

Population (2018)
  - Total: 43,332
- postal code: 610

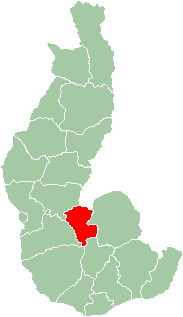

Benenitra is a district of Atsimo-Andrefana in Madagascar.

== Communes ==
The district is further divided into five communes:

- Ambalavato
- Ankilimary
- Benenitra
- Ehara
- Ianapera

== Geography ==
Benenitra is situated at the Onilahy River.
