= Bay of Saint-Augustin =

Bay on the coast of Madagascar

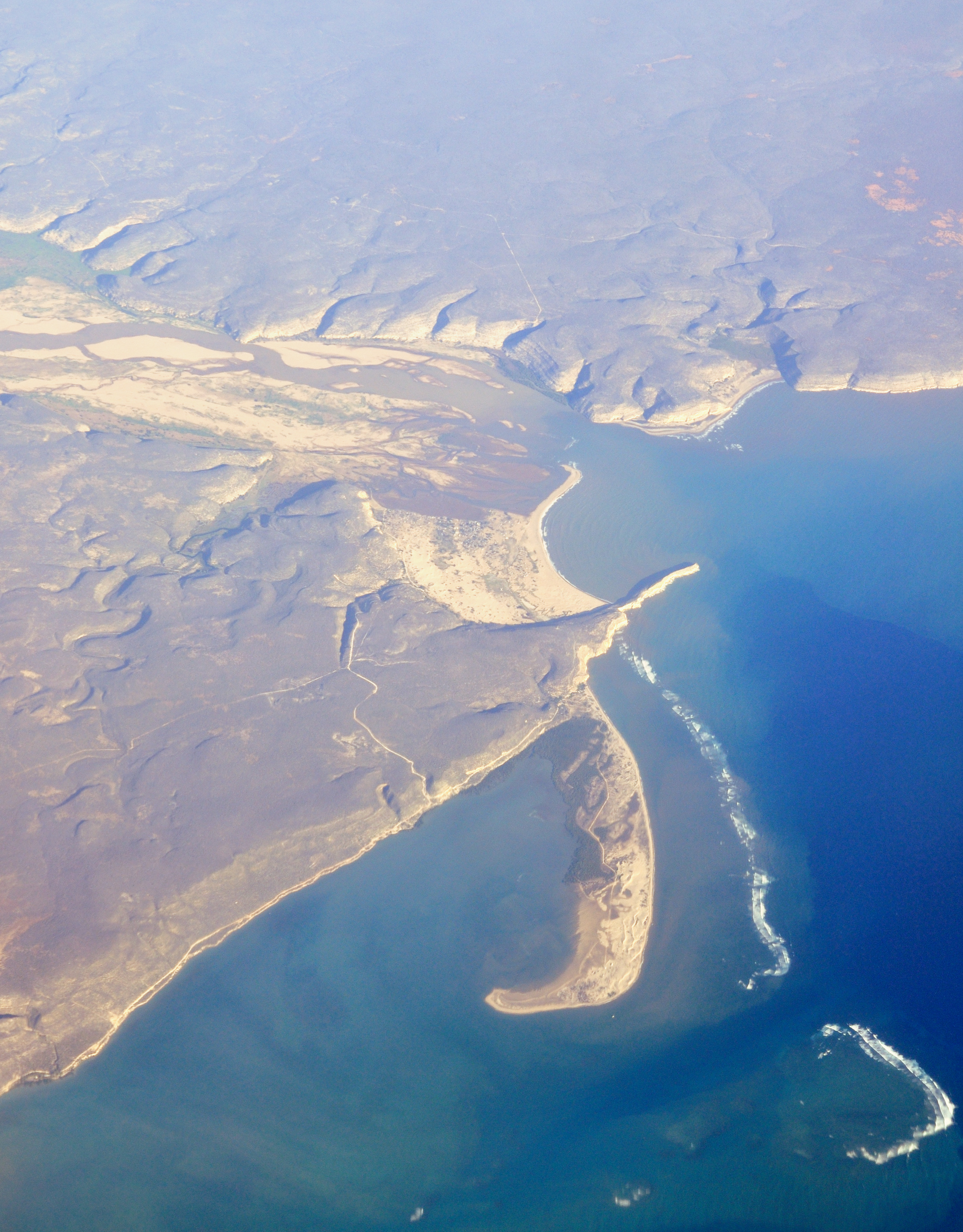

- Location within Madagascar
- Location: Atsimo-Andrefana, Madagascar
- Coordinates: 23°30′15″S 43°41′00″E
- River sources: Onilahy River
- Ocean/sea sources: Indian Ocean
- Basin countries: Madagascar
- Settlements: Anakao, Saint-Augustin

The Bay of Saint-Augustin is located on the southwestern coast of Madagascar in the region of Atsimo-Andrefana at the Mozambique Channel. This bay is the mouth of the Onilahy River at a distance of 35 kilometres south of Toliara.
