= Ankilimivony =

- Village
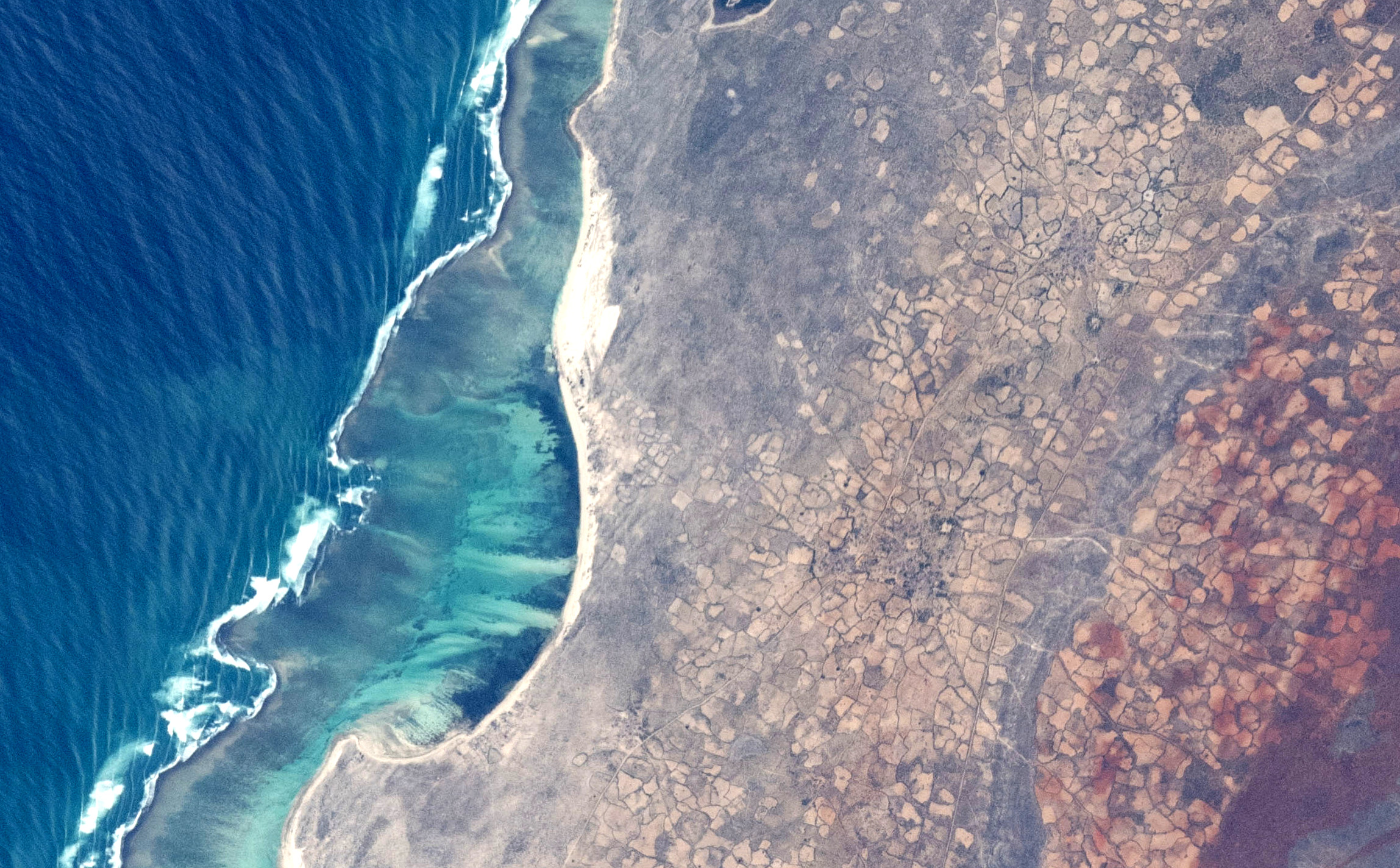
- village Ankilimivony, Andranotohoka and Befaso, view from space (ISS)

- Location in Madagascar
- Coordinates: 23°48′S 43°41′E
- Country: Madagascar
- Region: Atsimo-Andrefana
- District: Betioky Sud

Ankilimivony is a village on the southwest coast of Madagascar. It is located along the road from Anakao in the north and Ankiririsa to the southwest. The main part of the village is located about a mile inland but there is also a coastal fishing settlement. There is a resort for surfing, kitesurfing and whale watching between Ankilimivony and Anakao.
