= Raveloson =

Raveloson is a surname. Notable people with the surname include:

- Mahasumpo Raveloson (1909–1966), Malagasy politician
- Rayan Raveloson (born 1997), Malagasy footballer
