= Tsifota =

- Village
- Location in Madagascar
- Coordinates: 22°49′24″S 43°21′51″E
- Country: Madagascar
- Region: Atsimo-Andrefana
- District: Toliara II District
- Commune: Manombo Sud

Tsifota is a coastal fishing village on the west coast of Madagascar. It lies north of Toliara and Manombo and south of Tsiandamba. It is surrounded by the Ifaty Forest.
