= Ankilimalinike =

- Location in Madagascar
- Coordinates: 22°57′S 43°34′E
- Country: Madagascar
- Region: Atsimo-Andrefana
- District: Toliara II

Government
  - Mayor: Longin Mahatoro
- Elevation: 34 m (112 ft)

Population (2001)
  - Total: 13,000
- Time zone: UTC3 (EAT)
- Postal code: 602

Ankilimalinike is a rural municipality in Madagascar. It belongs to the district of Toliara II, which is a part of Atsimo-Andrefana Region. The population of the commune was estimated to be approximately 13,000 in 2001 commune census.

Only primary schooling is available. The majority 90% of the population of the commune are farmers, while an additional 5% receives their livelihood from raising livestock. The most important crops are cassava and cotton, while other important agricultural products are sugarcane and maize. Services provide employment for 5% of the population.
