= Behompy =

- Location in Madagascar
- Coordinates: 23°15′S 43°51′E
- Country: Madagascar
- Region: Atsimo-Andrefana
- District: Toliara II
- Elevation: 85 m (279 ft)

Population (2001)
  - Total: 7,000
- Time zone: UTC3 (EAT)
- Postal code: 602

Behompy is a rural municipality in Madagascar. It belongs to the district of Toliara II, which is a part of Atsimo-Andrefana Region. The population of the commune was estimated to be approximately 7,000 in 2001 commune census.

Primary and junior level secondary education are available in town. The majority 90% of the population of the commune are farmers, while an additional 7% receives their livelihood from raising livestock. The most important crops are maize and beans; also cassava is an important agricultural product. Services provide employment for 3% of the population.

In 2007 only 33.7 of the children of this municipality had been scolarized.
