= Maromiandra, Toliara II =

Maromiandra
- Location in Madagascar
- Coordinates: 23°16′S 43°42′E
- Country: Madagascar
- Region: Atsimo-Andrefana
- District: Toliara II

Government
  - Mayor: Edson
- Elevation: 23 m (75 ft)

Population (2001)
  - Total: 8,000
- Time zone: UTC3 (EAT)
- Postal code: 602

Maromiandra is a rural municipality in Madagascar. It belongs to the district of Toliara II, which is a part of Atsimo-Andrefana Region. The population of the commune was estimated to be approximately 8,000 in 2001.

Primary and junior level secondary education are available in town. The majority 98% of the population of the commune are farmers. The most important crop is maize, while other important products are sugarcane, cassava and sweet potatoes. Industry and services provide employment for 0.85% and 1.15% of the population, respectively.

In 2007 only 9.8% if the children had been scolarized.
