= Antanimena =

Municipality in southern Madagascar

Antanimena Antanimena Onilahy
- Location in Madagascar
- Coordinates: 23°33′S 44°6′E
- Country: Madagascar
- Region: Atsimo-Andrefana
- District: Toliara II
- Elevation: 146 m (479 ft)

Population (2001)
  - Total: 4,000
- Time zone: UTC3 (EAT)
- Postal code: 602

Antanimena (Antanimena Onilahy) is a municipality in Madagascar. It belongs to the district of Toliara II, which is a part of Atsimo-Andrefana Region. The population of the commune was estimated to be approximately 4,000 in 2001 commune census.

Primary and junior level secondary education are available in town. The majority 50% of the population of the commune are farmers, while an additional 42% receives their livelihood from raising livestock. The most important crops are sweet potatoes and cowpeas, while other important agricultural products are other peas and maize. Services provide employment for 6% of the population. Additionally fishing employs 2% of the population.

== Rivers ==
The commune is crossed by the Onilahy River.
