= Ankililoaka mine =

- Interactive map of Ankililoaka mine

Location
- Location: Ankililoake, Atsimo-Andrefana, Madagascar; 22°46′S 43°37′E

Production
- Products: Titanium

The Ankililoaka mine is one of the largest, projected titanium mines in Madagascar. The mine is located in Atsimo-Andrefana . The mine has reserves amounting to 368 million tonnes of ore grading 6% titanium.
