= Ankililoake =

Ankililoake Ankililoaka
- Location in Madagascar
- Coordinates: 22°46′S 43°37′E
- Country: Madagascar
- Region: Atsimo-Andrefana
- District: Toliara II
- Elevation: 86 m (282 ft)

Population (2001)
  - Total: 21,000
- Time zone: UTC3 (EAT)
- Postal code: 602

Ankililoake is a rural municipality in Madagascar. It belongs to the district of Toliara II, which is a part of Atsimo-Andrefana Region. The population of the commune was estimated to be approximately 21,000 in 2001 commune census.

In addition to primary schooling the town offers secondary education at both junior and senior levels. The majority 75% of the population of the commune are farmers, while an additional 15% receives their livelihood from raising livestock. The most important crops are cotton and cassava, while other important agricultural products are maize, sweet potatoes and rice. Services provide employment for 10% of the population.

== Geography ==
Ankililoaka is situated at 75 km North of Toliara on the National road 9.

== See also ==
- Ankililoaka mine
