= Mandrofify =

- Location in Madagascar
- Coordinates: 23°31′S 43°58′E
- Country: Madagascar
- Region: Atsimo-Andrefana
- District: Toliara II
- Elevation: 40 m (130 ft)

Population (2001)
  - Total: 8,000
- Time zone: UTC3 (EAT)

Mandrofify or Manorofify is a town and commune (Malagasy: kaominina) in Madagascar. It belongs to the district of Toliara II, which is a part of Atsimo-Andrefana Region. The town is situated at the Onilahy River. The population of the commune was estimated to be approximately 8,000 in 2001 commune census.

Only primary schooling is available. The majority 80% of the population of the commune are farmers, while an additional 15% receives their livelihood from raising livestock. The most important crops are sweet potatoes and tomato, while other important agricultural products are maize and cowpeas. Services provide employment for 2% of the population. Additionally fishing employs 3% of the population.
