= Anakao =

- Municipality
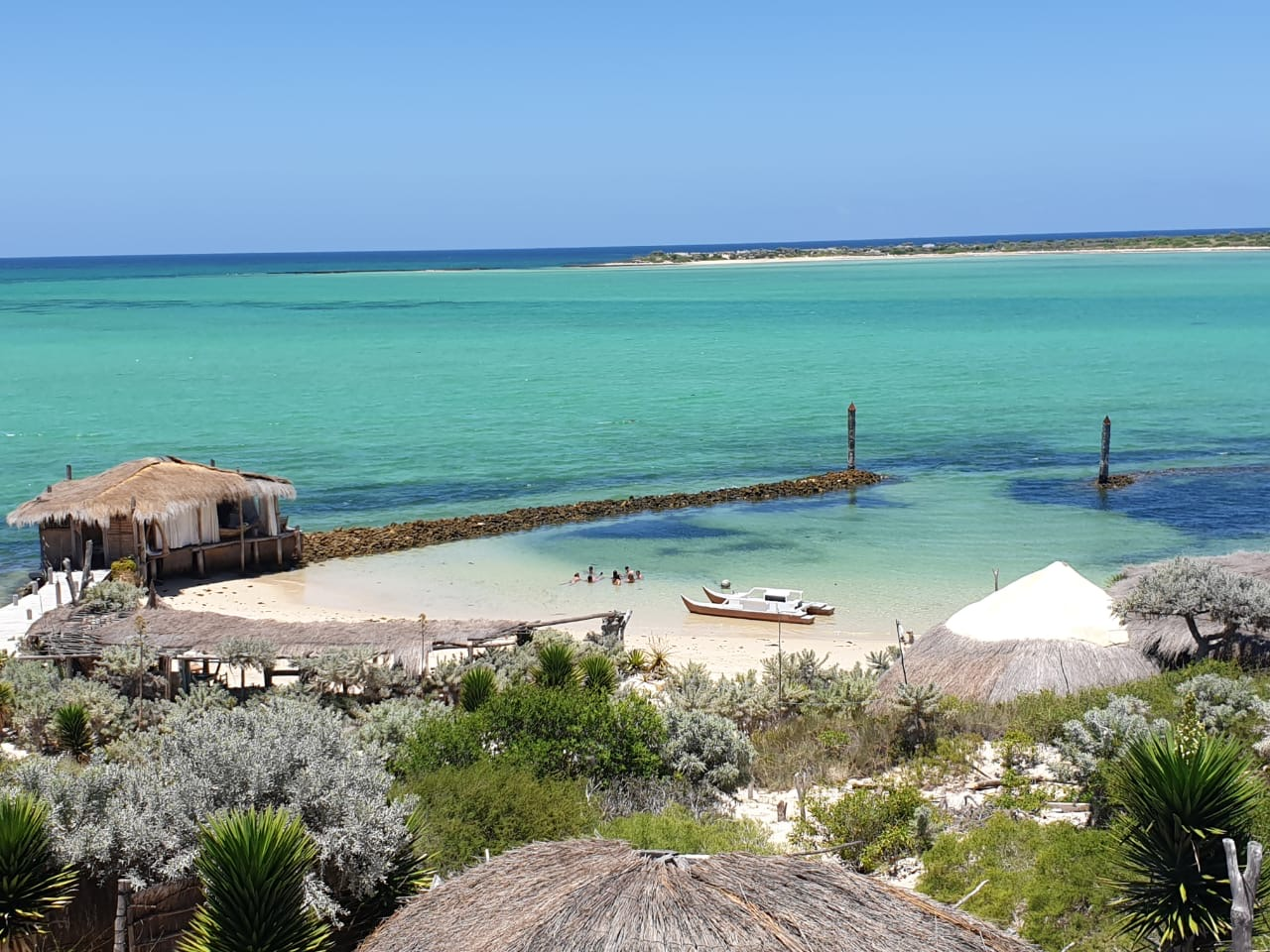

- Location in Madagascar
- Coordinates: 23°40′S 43°39′E
- Country: Madagascar
- Region: Atsimo-Andrefana
- District: Toliara II District
- Commune: Soalara

Government
  - Mayor: Gaston
- Postal code: 602

Anakao is a coastal municipality on the southwest coast of Madagascar, 35 kilometres south of Toliara.

It is located southwest of Soalara. It is inhabited by the Vezo people and is a beach ressort. There are some tombs located near the point of the town. The topography is described as "rather flat, except where the sandy soil forms dunes." To the south are the villages of Ankilimivony and Ankiririsa.

The municipality of Anakao also covers the following villages: Anakao Haut, Anakao Bas, Befasy and Maromena.
