= Belalanda =

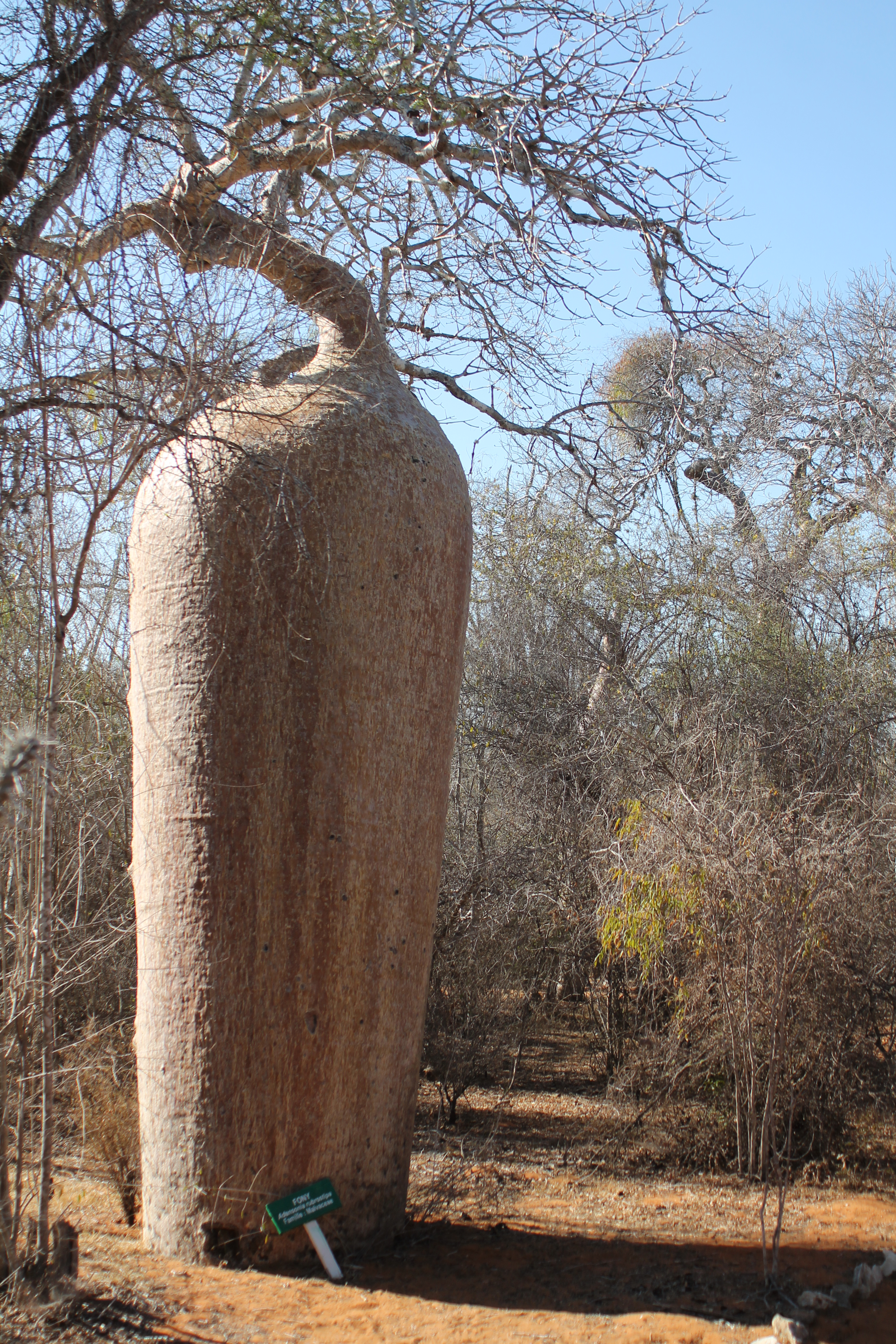
- A baobab in Mangily, Belalanda

- Location in Madagascar
- Coordinates: 23°17′S 43°39′E
- Country: Madagascar
- Region: Atsimo-Andrefana
- District: Toliara II

Government
  - Mayor: Bien-Aimé Fanampia
- Elevation: 12 m (39 ft)

Population (2001)
  - Total: 7,000
- Time zone: UTC3 (EAT)
- Postal code: 602

Belalanda is a rural municipality in Madagascar. It belongs to the district of Toliara II, which is a part of Atsimo-Andrefana Region. The population of the commune was estimated to be approximately 7,000 in 2001 commune census.

== History ==
First installations at Belalanda were made around 1700, known at that time as Ampasintanga by the Mahafaly. These have migrated since to Toliara and presently the municipality is mostly inhabited by Vezo people.

Belalanda is served by a local airport. Primary and junior level secondary education are available in town. The majority 60% of the population works in fishing. 19% are farmers, while an additional 20% receives their livelihood from raising livestock. The most important crop is cassava, while other important products are sugarcane, maize and sweet potatoes. Services provide employment for 1% of the population.

== Geography ==
Belalanda lies at the Northern banks of the mouth of the lower Fiherenana River, 10 km North of Tulear.

=== Roads ===
This municipality is crossed by the National road 9 (RN9).

== Tourism ==
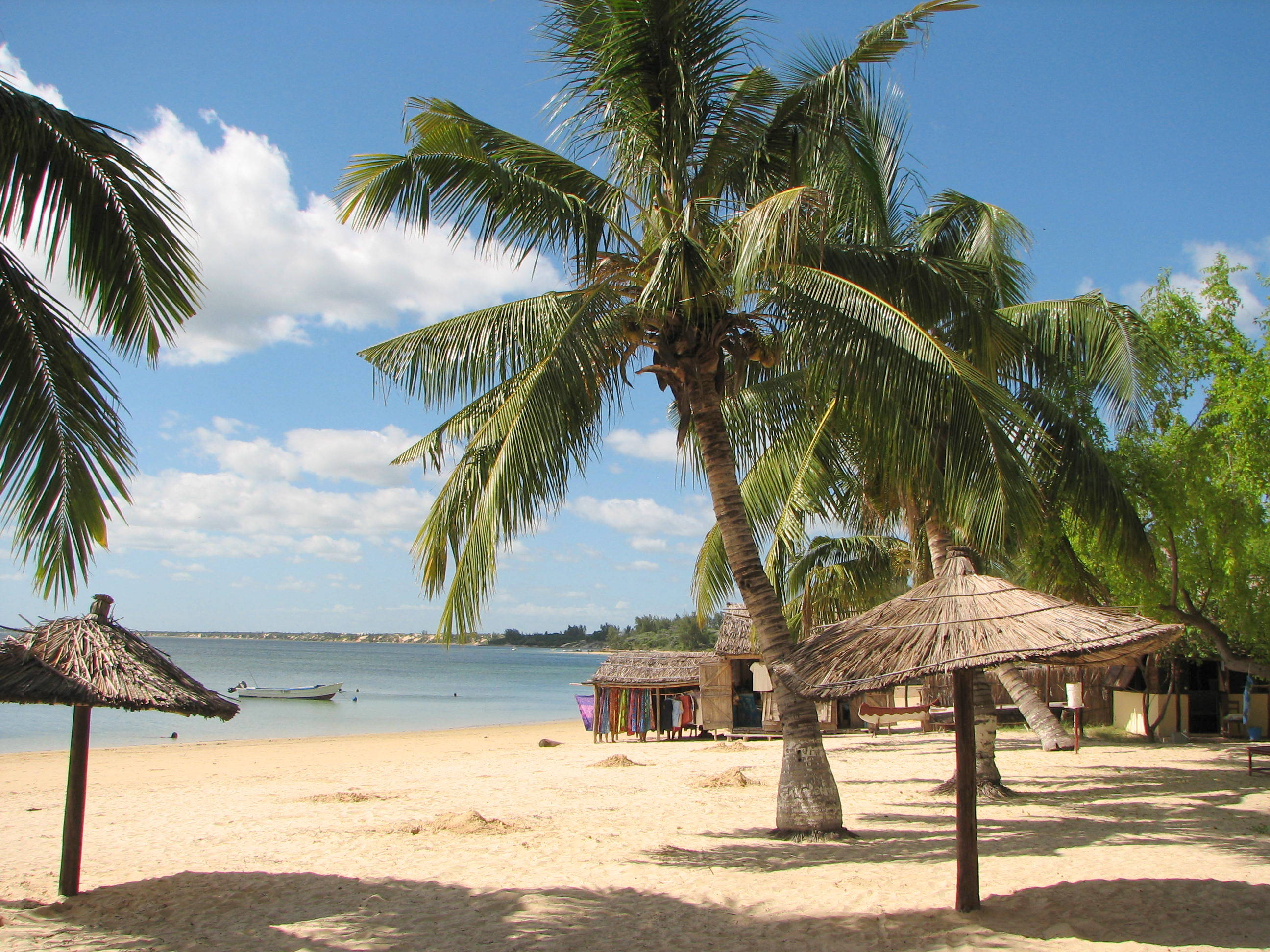
Ifaty beach, Madagascar

The beach of Mangily and Ifaty, high spots of tourism in the area of Tulear are situated on the territory of the municipality of Belalanda.

== Wildlife ==
It is home of the endangered chameleon Furcifer belalandaensis. In the village of Amondrolava this municipality disposes of one of the largest mangrove forests in southern Madagascar.

== Notable people ==
- Mahasumpo Raveloson (1909–1966), politician
