= Ianapera =

- Location in Madagascar
- Coordinates: 23°37′S 45°8′E
- Country: Madagascar
- Region: Atsimo-Andrefana
- District: Benenitra
- Elevation: 431 m (1,414 ft)

Population (2001)
  - Total: 10,000
- Time zone: UTC3 (EAT)

Ianapera is a town and commune in Madagascar. It belongs to the district of Benenitra, which is a part of Atsimo-Andrefana Region. The population of the commune was estimated to be approximately 10,000 in 2001 commune census.

Only primary schooling is available. The majority 65% of the population of the commune are farmers, while an additional 34% receives their livelihood from raising livestock. The most important crop is rice, while other important products are beans, cassava and sweet potatoes. Services provide employment for 1% of the population.

== Rivers ==
The commune is crossed by the Ianapera river.
