= Soalara =

Soalara Soalara Sud
- Location in Madagascar
- Coordinates: 23°35′S 43°43′E
- Country: Madagascar
- Region: Atsimo-Andrefana
- District: Toliara II

Government
  - Mayor: Jophelin Noasoavina

Area
  - Total: 525.41 km^{2} (202.86 sq mi)
- Elevation: 31 m (102 ft)

Population (2006)
  - Total: 7,774
- Time zone: UTC3 (EAT)
- Postal code: 602

Soalara or Soalara Sud is a rural municipality in Madagascar. It belongs to the district of Toliara II, which is a part of Atsimo-Andrefana Region. The population of the commune was estimated to be approximately 7774 in 2006. Soalara is served by a local airport and riverine harbour. Primary and junior level secondary education are available in town. The majority 60% of the population works in fishing. 15% are farmers, while an additional 20% receives their livelihood from raising livestock. The most important crop is cassava, while other important products are sweet potatoes and cowpeas. Services provide employment for 5% of the population.

== Geography ==
It is situated at the southern side of the mouth of the Onilahy River. A ferry used to assure transport to Saint Augustin, Madagascar but it broke down. It is necessary to take small outrigger canoes or to make the trip around the bay (250 km).

== Infrastructure ==
There is none. The infrastructure of this town can be called a disaster: there is no post-office, no water supplies, no electricity, no hospital. The harbor has fallen into pieces. Ferry: none. And its airport? Just forget it ! Access by route to the next point of civilisation: 300km (unpaved).

3 radio stations can be received and there are 3 shops.

== Communes ==
Soalara Sud

- Number of fokontany (villages): 07
- Name of the fokontany (villages) : Soalara Haut, Soalara Bas, Marovale, Sirafaly, Ankilimnivony, Andranotohoke, Ambahevahe
