= Tsianisiha =

- Location in Madagascar
- Coordinates: 22°54′S 43°35′E
- Country: Madagascar
- Region: Atsimo-Andrefana
- District: Toliara II
- Elevation: 54 m (177 ft)

Population (2001)
  - Total: 18,000
- Time zone: UTC3 (EAT)

Tsianisiha is a town and commune (Malagasy: kaominina) in Madagascar. It belongs to the district of Toliara II, which is a part of Atsimo-Andrefana Region. The population of the commune was estimated to be approximately 18,000 in 2001 commune census.

Primary and junior level secondary education are available in town. Farming and raising livestock provides employment for 40% and 58% of the working population. The most important crop is cotton, while other important products are maize, cassava and cowpeas. Services provide employment for 2% of the population.
