= Ankilimary =

- Location in Madagascar
- Coordinates: 23°26′S 45°33′E
- Country: Madagascar
- Region: Atsimo-Andrefana
- District: Benenitra
- Elevation: 560 m (1,840 ft)

Population (2018)
  - Total: 5,329
- Time zone: UTC3 (EAT)
- postal code: 610

Ankilimary is a rural commune in Atsimo-Andrefana Region, Madagascar. It is situated in the district of Benenitra.

== Geography ==
Ankilimary is situated at the Onilahy River.
