= Beheloke =

Coordinates: 23.9017°S 43.7635°E

- Interactive map of Beheloke
- Country: Madagascar
- Region: Atsimo-Andrefana
- District: Toliara II

Population (2001)
  - Total: 10,000
- Time zone: UTC3 (EAT)

Beheloke is a town and commune (Malagasy: kaominina) in Madagascar. It is located in the district of Toliara II, which is a part of Atsimo-Andrefana Region. The population of the commune was estimated to be approximately 10,000 according to the 2001 commune census.

The town offers primary and junior-level secondary education. Farming and raising livestock raising provide employment for 5% and 70% of the working population. The most important crop is cassava, with other important products including maize, sweet potatoes and cowpeas. Services provide employment for 5% of the population, while fishing employs 20% of the population.
