= Ambohimahavelona =

- Location in Madagascar
- Coordinates: 23°26′S 43°53′E
- Country: Madagascar
- Region: Atsimo-Andrefana
- District: Toliara II
- Elevation: 108 m (354 ft)

Population (2001)
  - Total: 13,000
- Time zone: UTC3 (EAT)

Ambohimahavelona is a town and commune (Malagasy: kaominina) in Madagascar. It belongs to the district of Toliara II, which is a part of Atsimo-Andrefana Region. The population of the commune was estimated to be 13,000 in a 2001 commune census.

Primary and junior level secondary education are available in town. The majority (80%) of the population of the commune are farmers, while an additional 5% receive their livelihood from raising livestock. The most important crops are maize and rice, while other important agricultural products are sugarcane and tomato. Services provide employment for 15% of the population.
