= Milenaka =

- Location in Madagascar
- Coordinates: 22°50′S 43°35′E
- Country: Madagascar
- Region: Atsimo-Andrefana
- District: Toliara II
- Elevation: 72 m (236 ft)

Population (2001)
  - Total: 15,000
- Time zone: UTC3 (EAT)
- Postal code: 602

Milenaka is a rural municipality in Madagascar. It belongs to the district of Toliara II, which is a part of Atsimo-Andrefana Region. The population of this municipality was estimated to be approximately 15,000 in 2001 commune census.

== Geography ==
It is situated in the north of Toliara (Tuléar) on the National road 9.

Only primary schooling is available. The majority 80% of the population of the commune are farmers, while an additional 18% receives their livelihood from raising livestock. The most important crop is rice, while other important products are cotton, maize and cassava. Services provide employment for 2% of the population.
