= Miary =

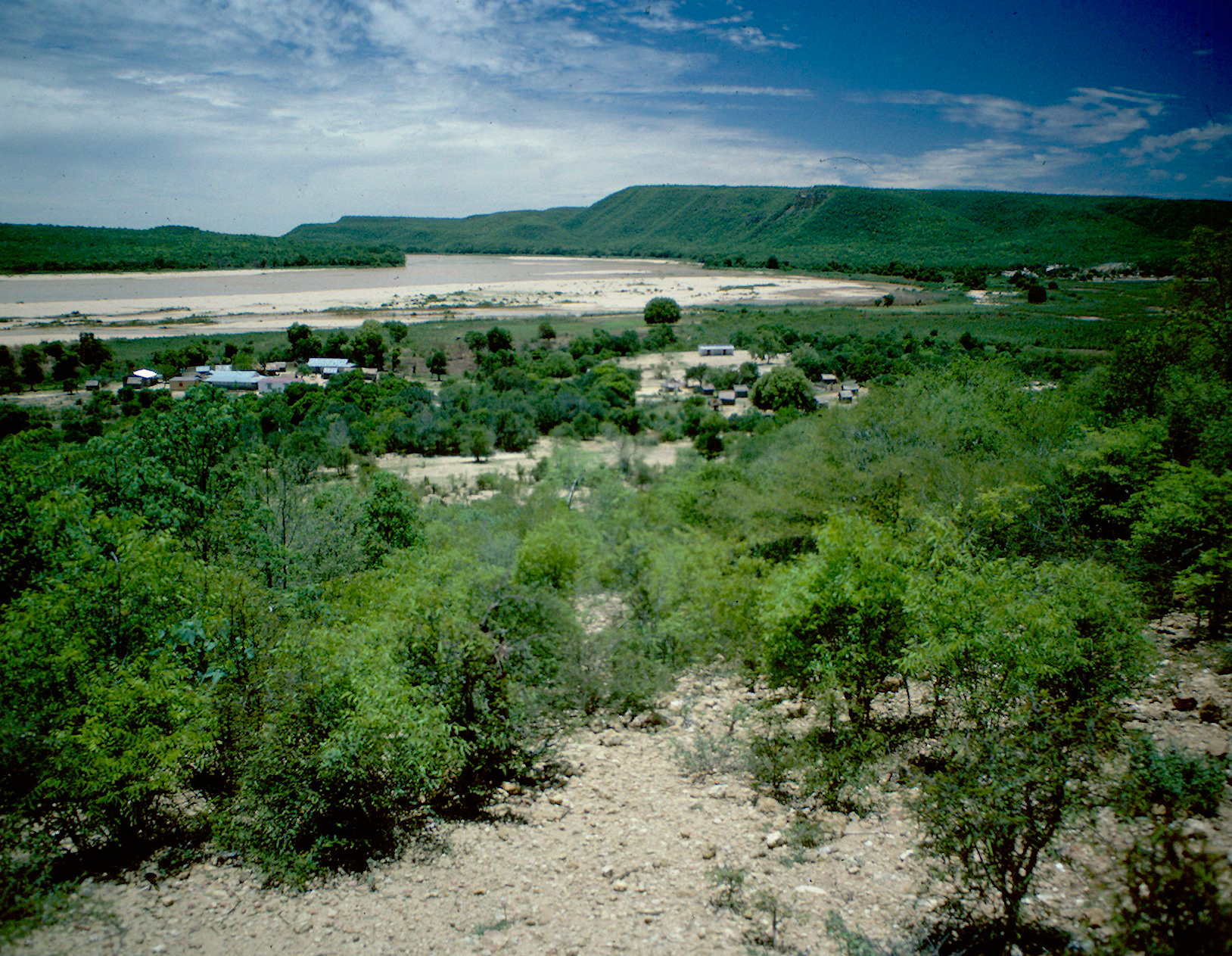
- Fiherenana River at Miary

- Location in Madagascar
- Coordinates: 23°18′S 43°44′E
- Country: Madagascar
- Region: Atsimo-Andrefana
- District: Toliara II

Area
  - Total: 140 km^{2} (54 sq mi)
- Elevation: 34 m (112 ft)

Population (2008)
  - Total: 12,500
  - Ethnicities: Masikoro (90%)
- Time zone: UTC3 (EAT)
- Postal code: 602

Miary is a rural municipality in Madagascar. It belongs to the district of Toliara II, which is a part of Atsimo-Andrefana Region. The population of the municipality was estimated to be approximately 12500 in 2008 of which 90% are Masikoro. The municipality has 11 fokontany (villages).

Primary and junior level secondary education are available in town. The rate of scolarization in Miary had been 70% in 2007. Farming and raising livestock provides employment for 40% and 40% of the working population. The most important crops are cotton and cassava, while other important agricultural products are sugarcane and maize. Services provide employment for 20% of the population.

Miary has a health center Type II (CSB II).

== Geography ==
Miary lies on the left banks of the lower Fiherenana River, 10 km North-East of Tulear.

== Sights ==
Miary is famous its sacred tree (L'arbre de Miary), a banyan which is said to be 1,700 years old. It is in the eastern part of the village close to the Market Place. On the Market Place opposite the Town hall (Mairie), a market hall and an independence memorial can be visited.

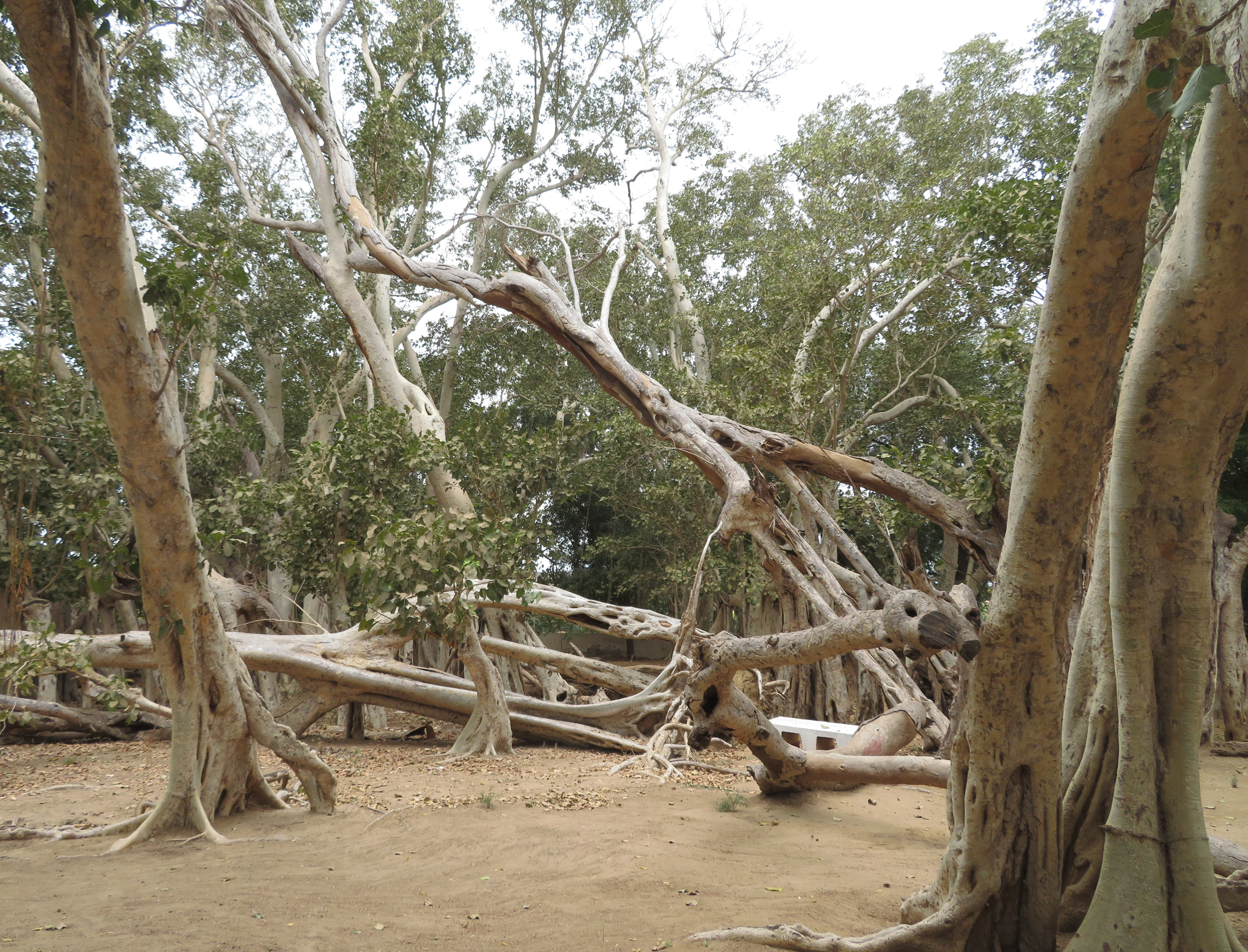
L'arbre de Miary

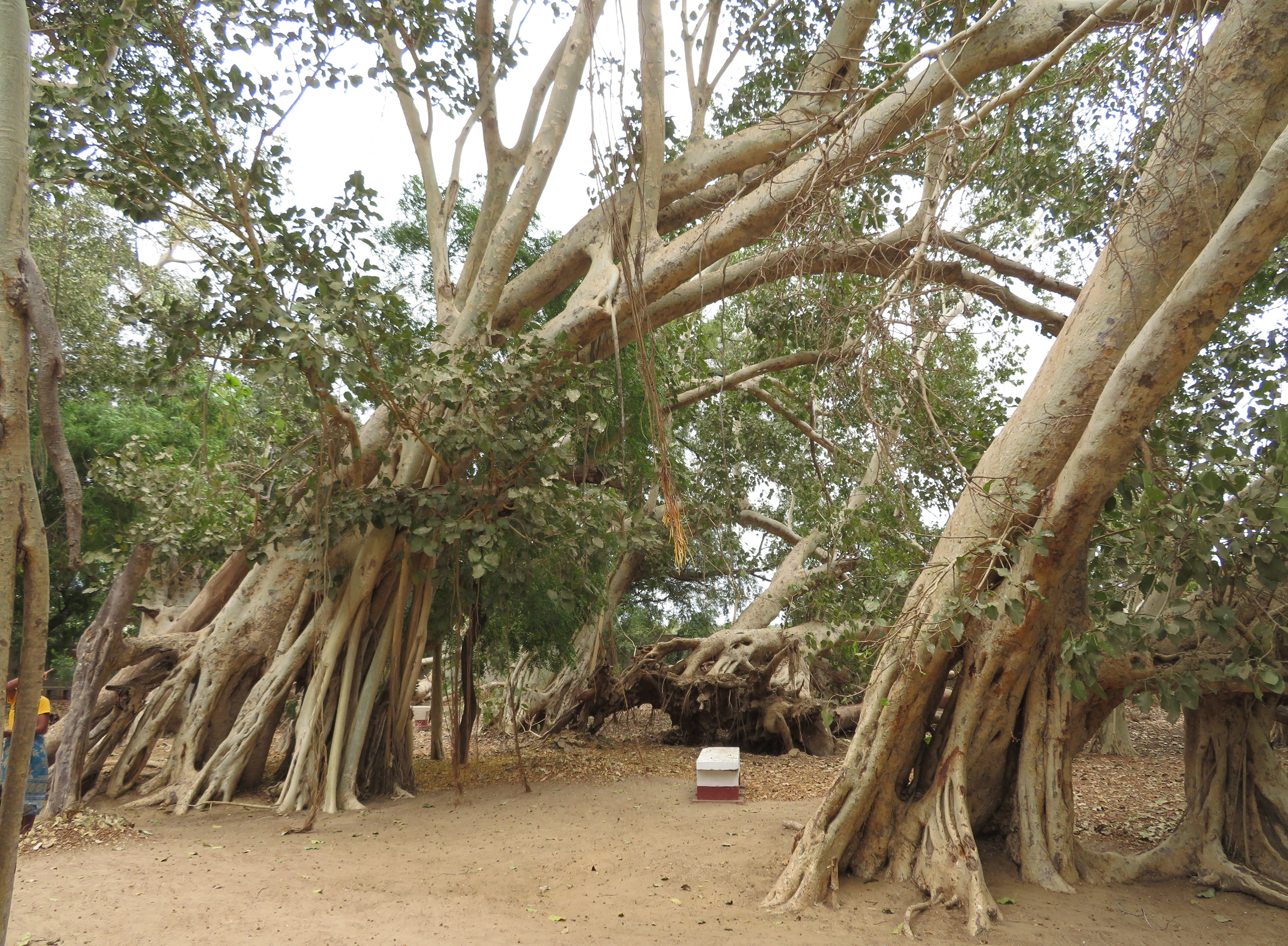
L'arbre de miary

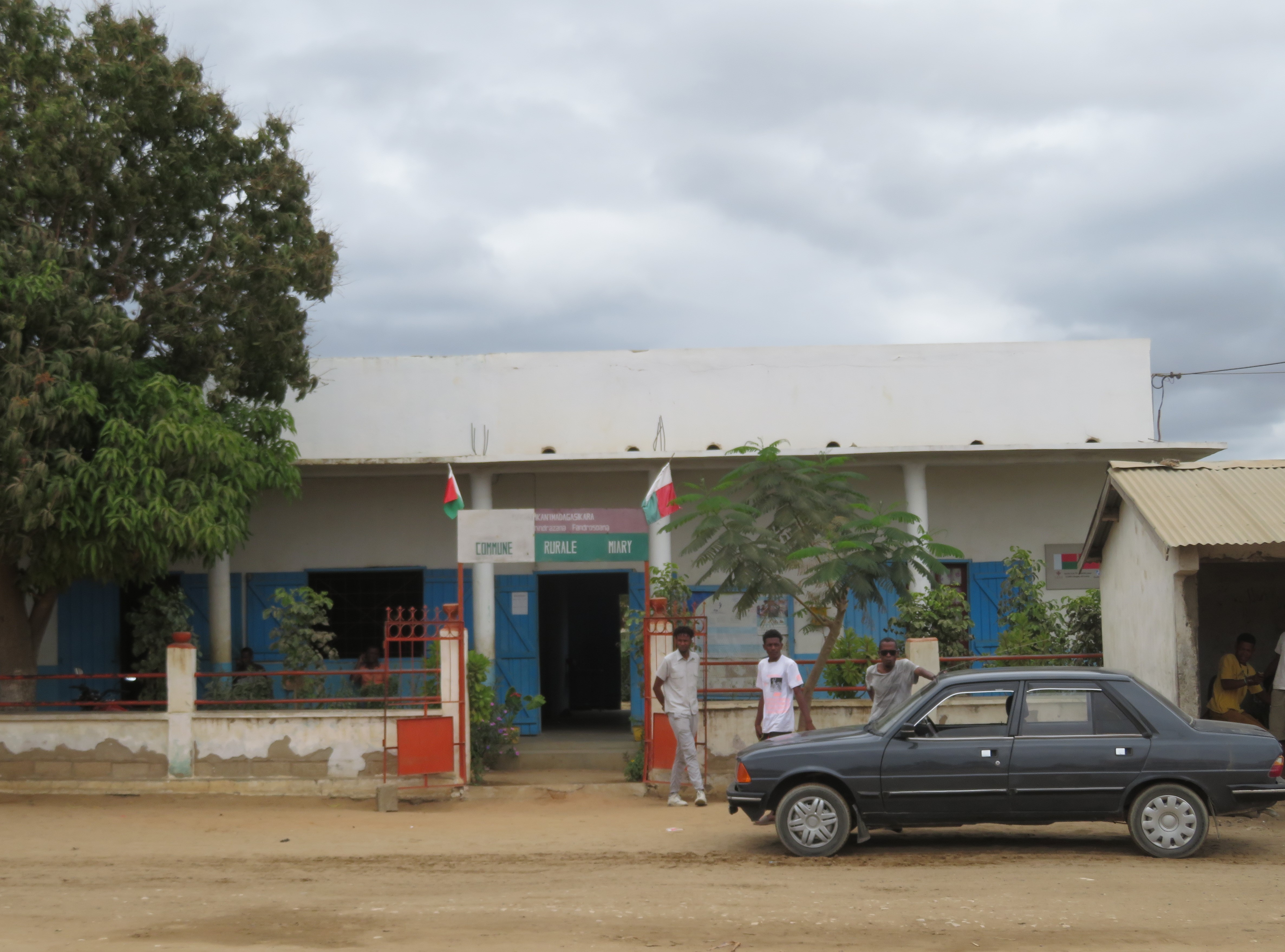
Town hall

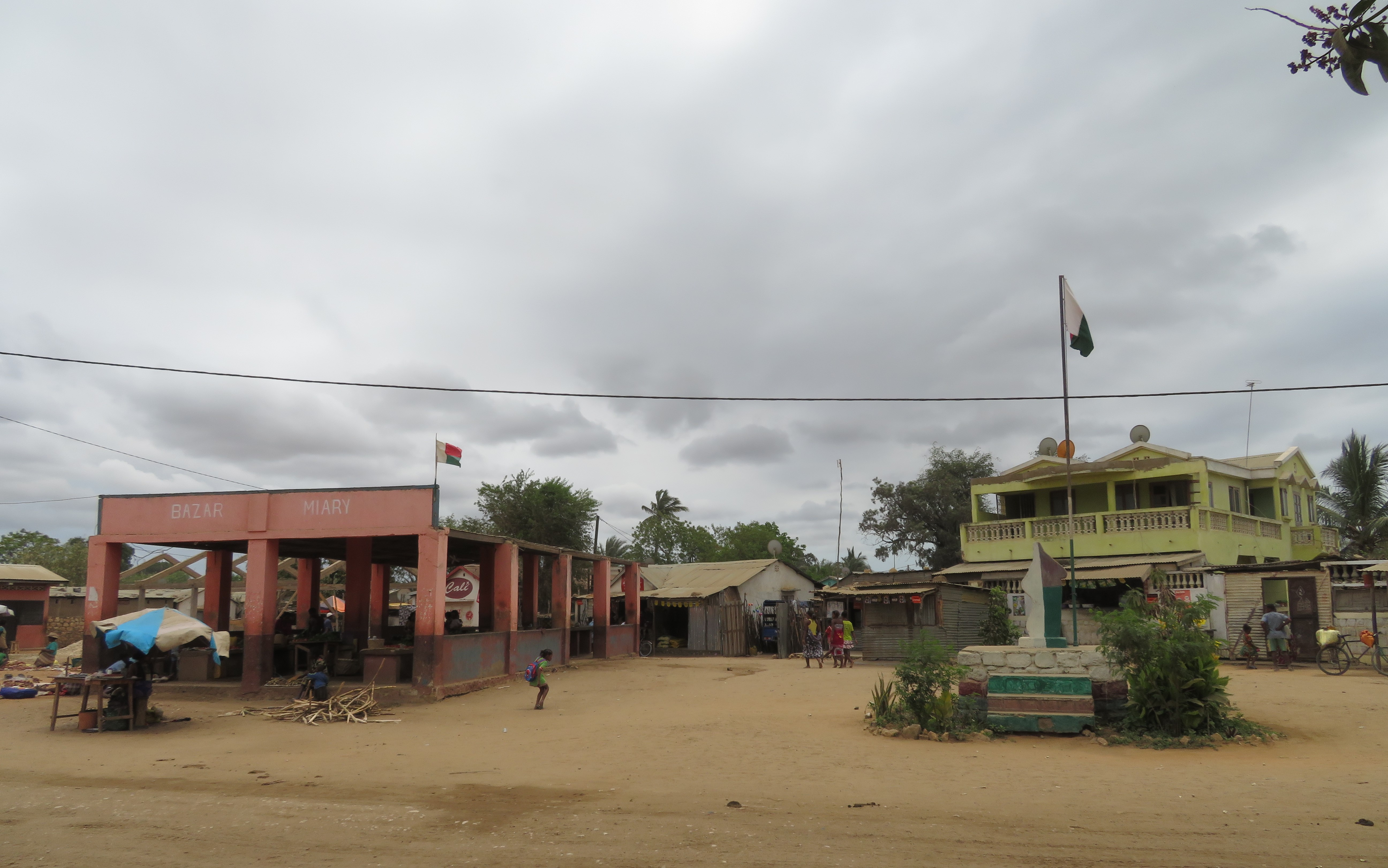
Market Place

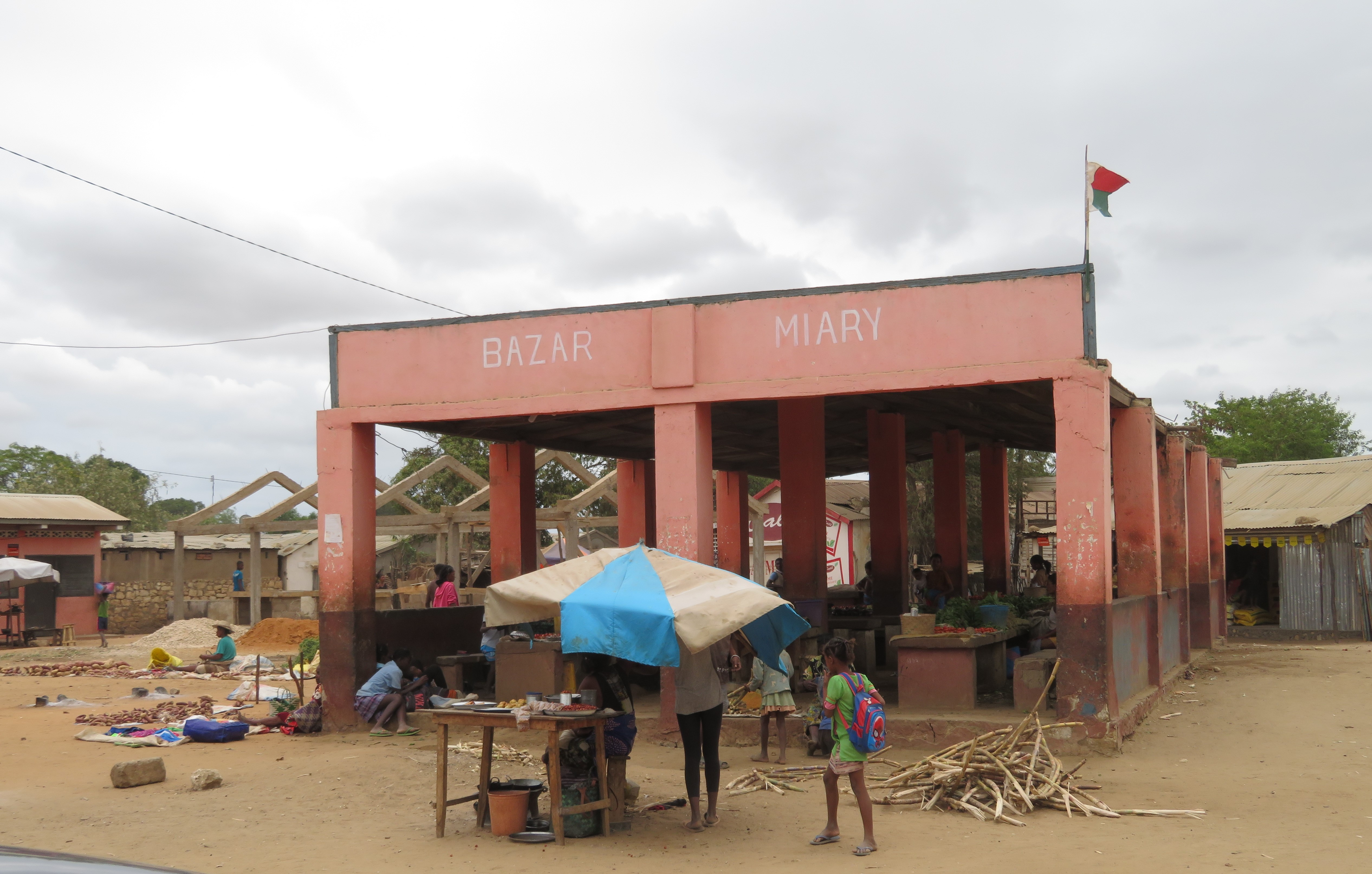
Market hall
