= Benenitra =

- Location in Madagascar
- Coordinates: 22°27′S 45°4′E
- Country: Madagascar
- Region: Atsimo-Andrefana
- District: Benenitra
- Elevation: 240 m (790 ft)

Population (2015)
  - Total: 39,766
- Time zone: UTC3 (EAT)
- postal code: 610

Benenitra is a town in Atsimo-Andrefana Region, Madagascar. It is situated in the district with the same name: Benenitra (district).

On 27 July 2018 a meteriote of an age of 4.56 billion years crushed at Benenitra.

== Mining ==
There are coal deposits at 15km from Benenitra which have not been mined.

== Geography ==
Benenitra is situated at the Onilahy River and on the National Road T 17 A.
