= Ehara =

- Location in Madagascar
- Coordinates: 23°29′S 44°50′E
- Country: Madagascar
- Region: Atsimo-Andrefana
- District: Benenitra
- Elevation: 202 m (663 ft)

Population (2001)
  - Total: 5,000
- Time zone: UTC3 (EAT)

Ehara is a town and commune in Madagascar. It belongs to the district of Benenitra, which is a part of Atsimo-Andrefana Region. The population of the commune was estimated to be approximately 5,000 in 2001 commune census.

Only primary schooling is available. 60% of the population of the commune are farmers, while an additional 35% make their livelihood from raising livestock. The most important crop is rice, while other important products are sugarcane and cassava. Services provide employment for 5% of the population.

== Geography ==
Ehara is situated at the Sakamare, near its mouth in the Onilahy River.
