= Marofoty =

- Location in Madagascar
- Coordinates: 22°56′S 43°34′E
- Country: Madagascar
- Region: Atsimo-Andrefana
- District: Toliara II
- Elevation: 37 m (121 ft)

Population (2001)
  - Total: 17,000
- Time zone: UTC3 (EAT)

Marofoty is a town and commune (Malagasy: kaominina) in Madagascar. It belongs to the district of Toliara II, which is a part of Atsimo-Andrefana Region. The population of the commune was estimated to be approximately 17,000 in the 2001 commune census.

Primary and junior level secondary education are available in town. The majority 80% of the population of the commune are farmers, while an additional 15% receives their livelihood from raising livestock. The most important crops are maize and cotton, while other important agricultural products are sugarcane and cassava. Services provide employment for 5% of the population.
