= Manombo River =

River in Madagascar

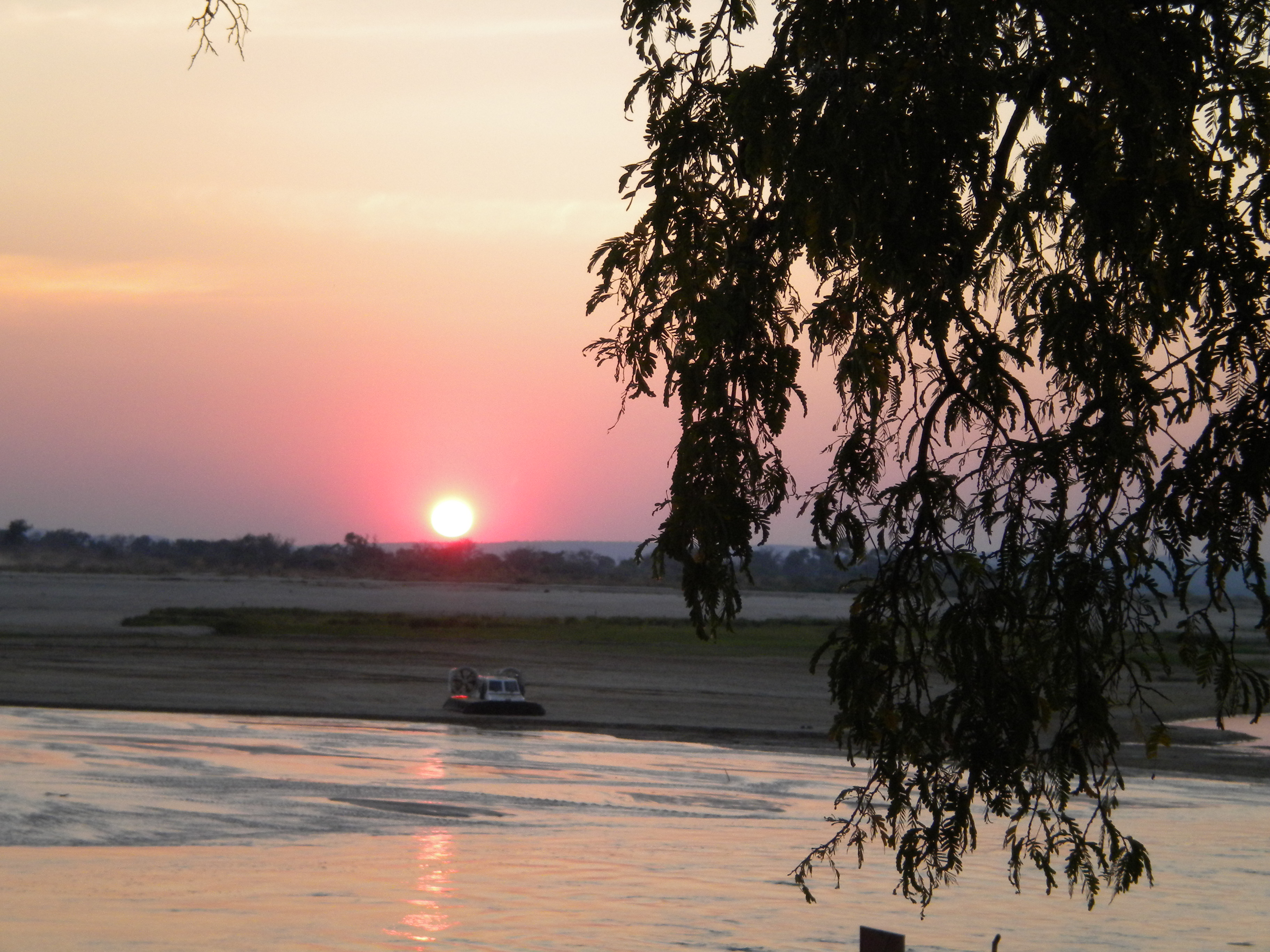
- Manombo river near Beroroha

Location
- Country: Madagascar
- Region: Atsimo-Andrefana

Physical characteristics
- Mouth: Mozambique Channel, Indian Ocean
  - location: Atsimo-Andrefana
  - coordinates: 22°58′S 43°28′E, near Manombo Sud
- Length: 100 km (62 mi)

The Manombo River is a river in Southern Madagascar. It empties in the Indian Ocean near the village of Manombo Sud and is crossed by the RN 9 near Beroroha.

Rainfall in the Manombo Sud area only averages about 491 mm per year, with a strong tendency towards rainfall variability.

The river's flow regime is therefore poor because the flow is intermittent, characterized by sudden, brief floods from November to March, followed by a rapid drying-up, and it rarely reaches the sea.
