= Manombo Sud =

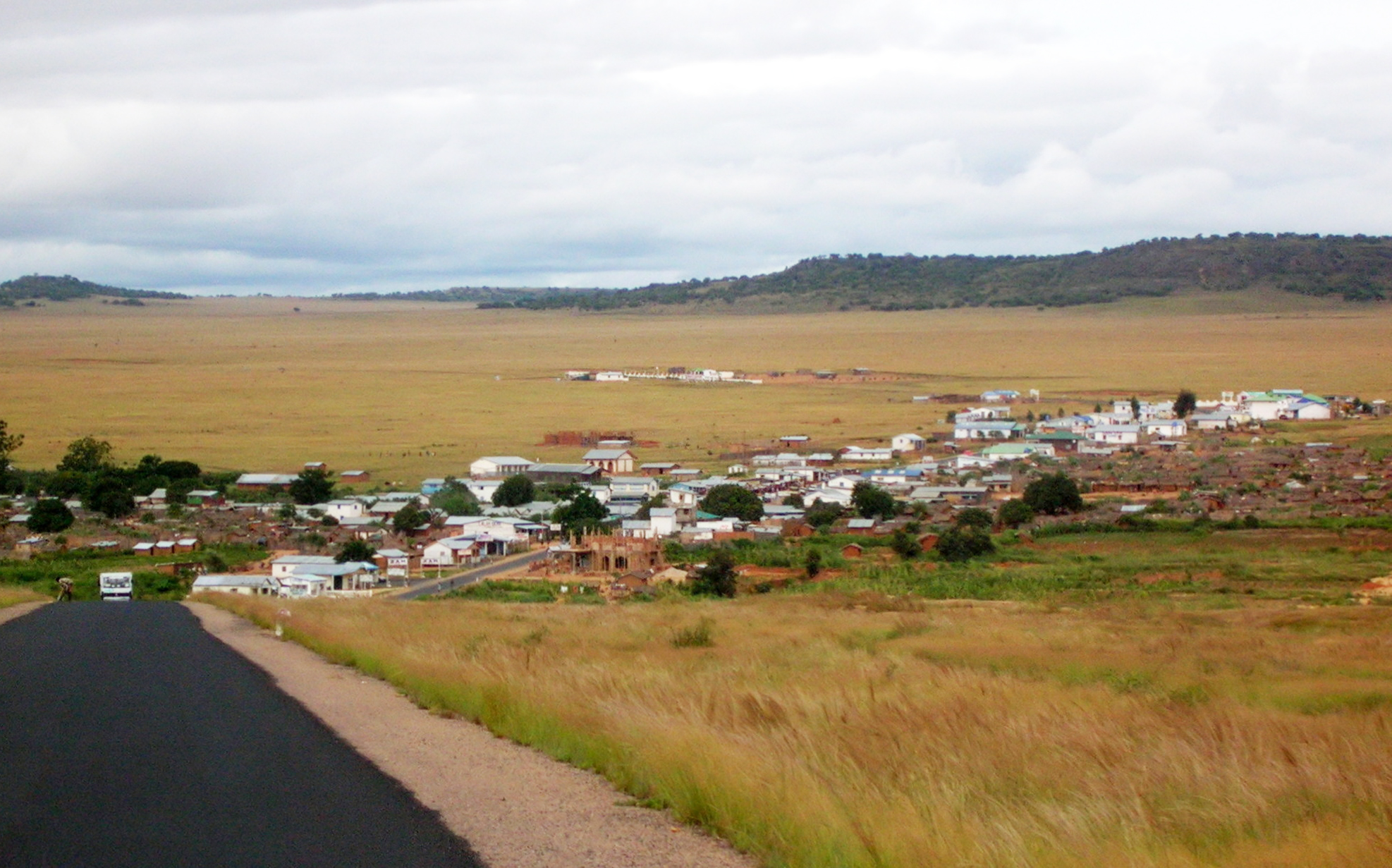

- Location in Madagascar
- Coordinates: 22°57′S 43°28′E
- Country: Madagascar
- Region: Atsimo-Andrefana
- District: Toliara II
- Elevation: 11 m (36 ft)

Population (2001)
  - Total: 17,000
- Time zone: UTC3 (EAT)
- Postal code: 602

Manombo Sud is a rural municipality in Madagascar. It belongs to the district of Toliara II, which is a part of Atsimo-Andrefana Region. It lies on the mouth of the Manombo River into the Indian Ocean. The population of the commune was estimated to be approximately 17,000 in the 2001 commune census.

Rainfall in the Manombo Sud area averages only about 491 mm per year.

Primary and junior level secondary education are available in town. The majority (55%) of the population works in fishing. 35% are farmers, while an additional 5% receive their livelihood from raising livestock. The most important crops are cassava and sugarcane, while other important agricultural products are maize and lima beans. Services provide employment for 5% of the population.

== See also ==
- Tsifota - a fishing village of this municipality.
- Manombo River
