= Ankiririsa =

- Village
- Location in Madagascar
- Coordinates: 23°54′S 43°41′E
- Country: Madagascar
- Region: Atsimo-Andrefana
- District: Betioky Sud

Ankiririsa is a coastal fishing village on the southwest coast of Madagascar. It is connected by road to Anakao in the north. To the southeast is the Lake Tsimanampetsotsa and Tsimanampetsotsa National Park.
