= Mahasumpo Raveloson =

Malagasy politician

Mahasumpo Raveloson (January 1, 1909 in Belalanda, Madagascar – October 7, 1966) was a politician from Madagascar who served in the French National Assembly from 1951-1956.
