= Onilahy River =

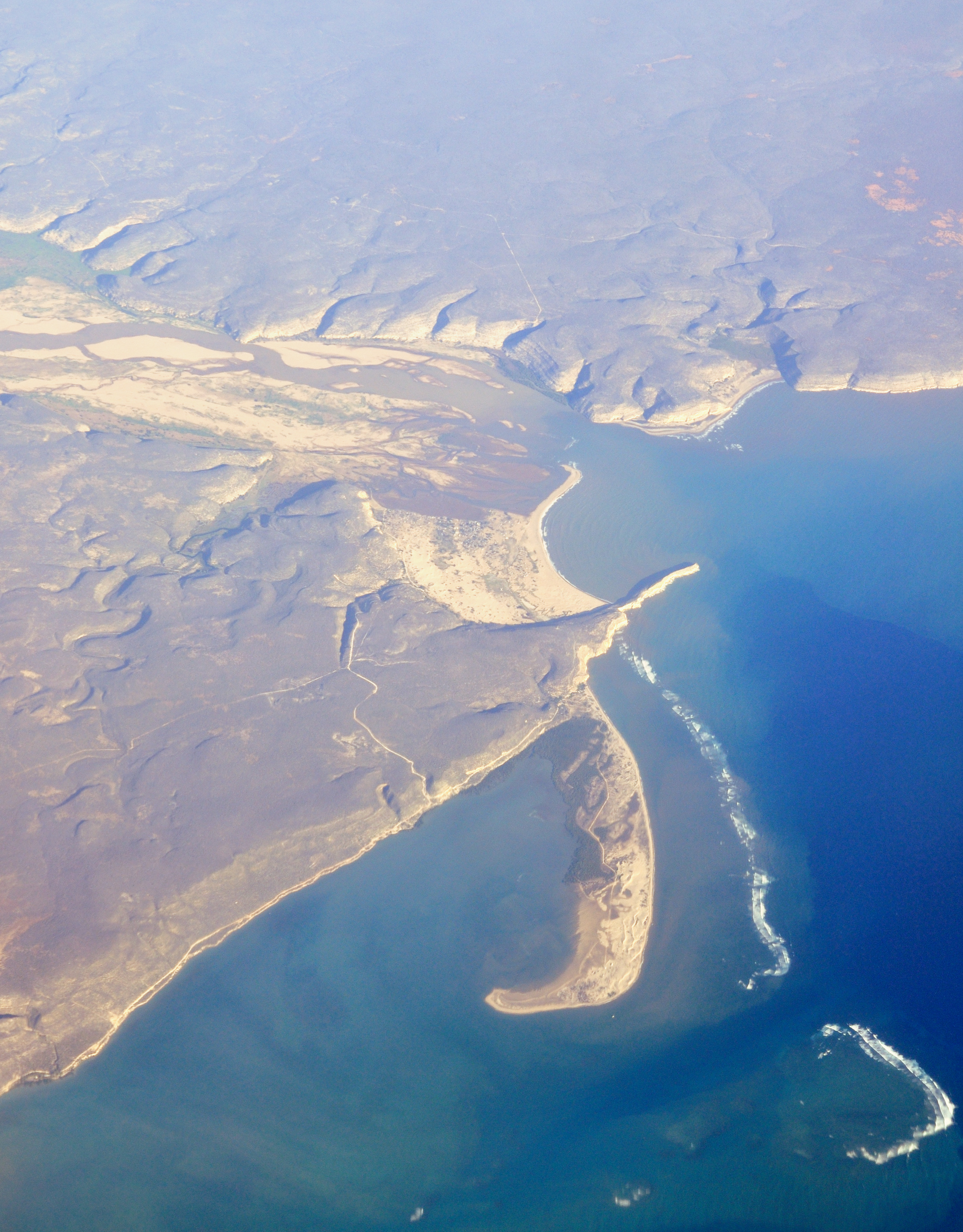
- Onilahy River estuary

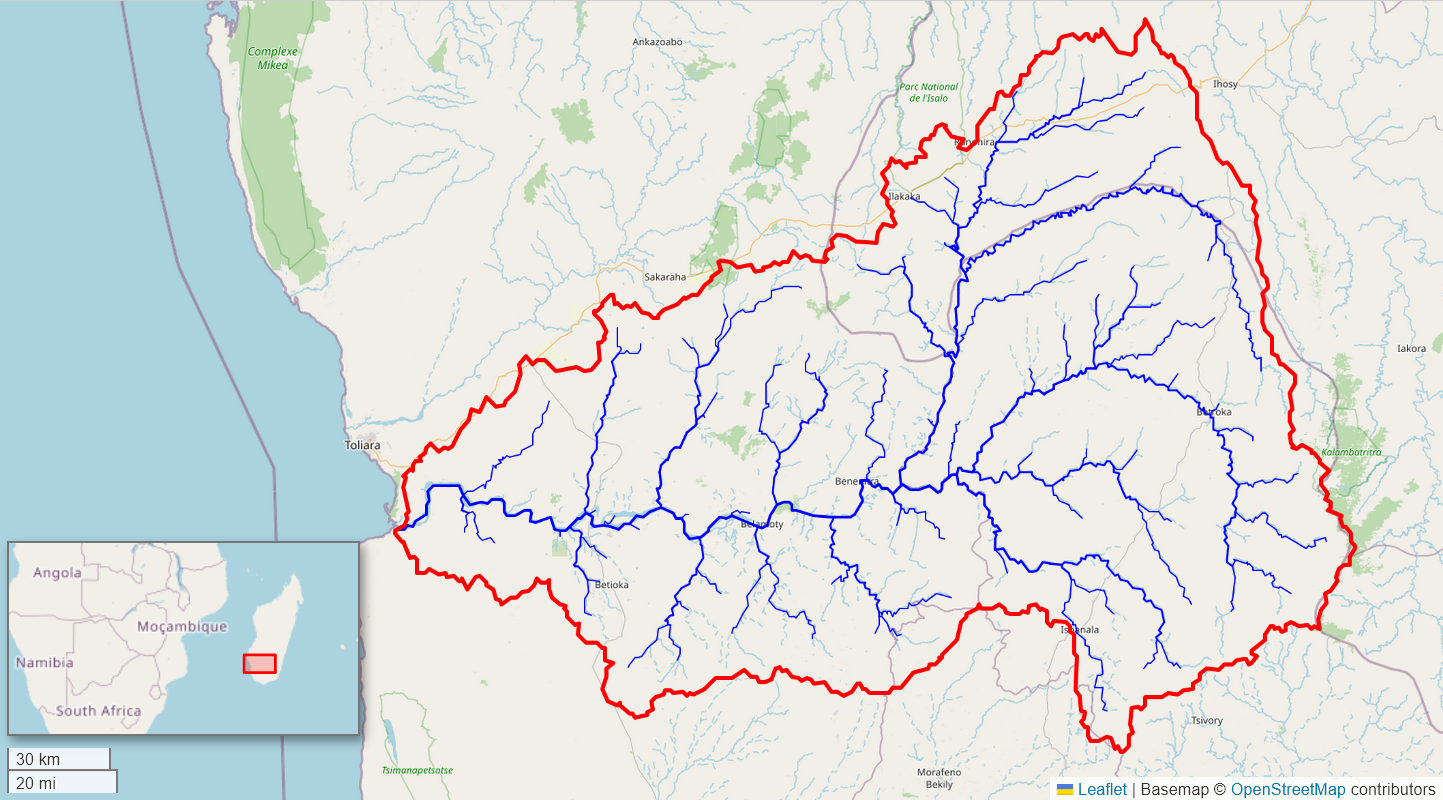
- Map of the Onilahy River watershed

Location
- Country: Madagascar
- region: Atsimo-Andrefana, Anosy
- Cities: Mandrofify, Ambolofoty

Physical characteristics
- Source
  - location: near Betroka
- Mouth: Bay of Saint-Augustin
  - location: Saint Augustin, Mozambique Channel
  - elevation: 0m
- Length: 525 km (326 mi)
- Basin size: 31,600 km^{2} (12,200 mi^{2})
- Discharge
  - location: Near mouth
  - average: (Period: 1971–2000)183 m^{3}/s (6,500 cu ft/s)

Basin features
- Protection status

Ramsar Wetland
- Official name: Zones humides de l'Onilahy
- Designated: 22 May 2017
- Reference no.: 2304

Onilahy is a river in Atsimo-Andrefana and Anosy (Toliara Province), southern Madagascar. It flows down from the hills near Betroka to the Mozambique Channel. It empties at St. Augustin (23.5666667°S 43.75°E), and into the Bay of Saint-Augustin.

Two species of cichlids are endemic to the river basin, but Ptychochromis onilahy is probably already extinct and the remaining range of Ptychochromoides betsileanus covers less than 10 square kilometres (3.9 mi^{2}).

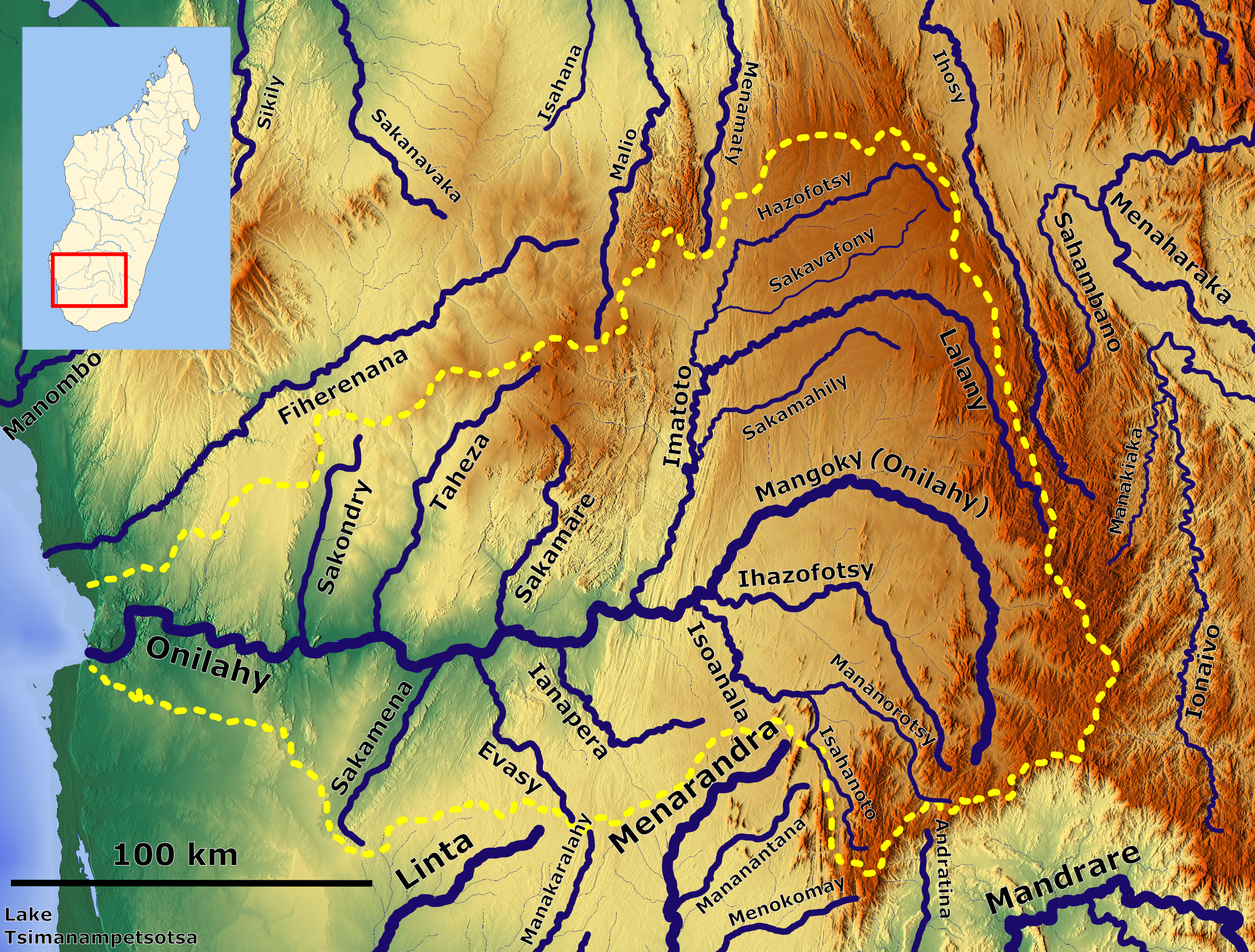
Onilahy Basin

== Geography ==
Sources of the Onilahy river are near Beadabo. It flows through Ankilimary, to Benenitra, Ehara, Bezaha and Antanimena. It is crossed by the RN 10 near Tameantsoa. The mouth of the Onilahy river is situated in the Indian Ocean at Saint Augustin, Madagascar, 35 km south of Toliara (Tuléar).

Its main affluentes from its south are Sakamena river, Evasy River, Ianapera River, Isoanala river and the Ihazofotsy River. From the north these are Sakondry, Taheza, Sakamare and the Imatoto rivers.
