= Toliara II District =

Toliara II
- District
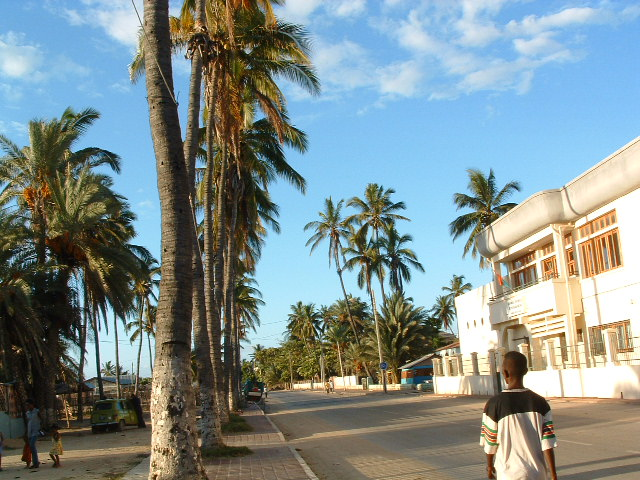
- Avenue in downtown Toliara

- Location within Madagascar
- Country: Madagascar

Toliara II is a district of Atsimo-Andrefana in Madagascar.

== Communes ==
The district is further divided into 19 communes:

- Ambohimahavelona
- Ambolofoty
- Analamisampy
- Andranovory
- Ankililoake
- Ankilimalinike
- Antanimena
- Beheloke
- Behompy
- Belalanda
- Mandrofify
- Manombo Sud
- Marofoty
- Maromiandra
- Miary
- Milenaka
- Saint Augustin
- Soalara
- Tsianisiha

== Protected areas ==
- Part of Tsinjoriake protected harmonious landscape
- Ranobe Bay protected area
- Part of Ranobe PK32 protected area
- Part of Mikea National Park
- Part of Nosy Ve-Androka National Park
- Tsimanampetsotsa National Park
- Soariake natural resources reserve
- Part of Amoron'i Onilahy protected harmonious landscape
