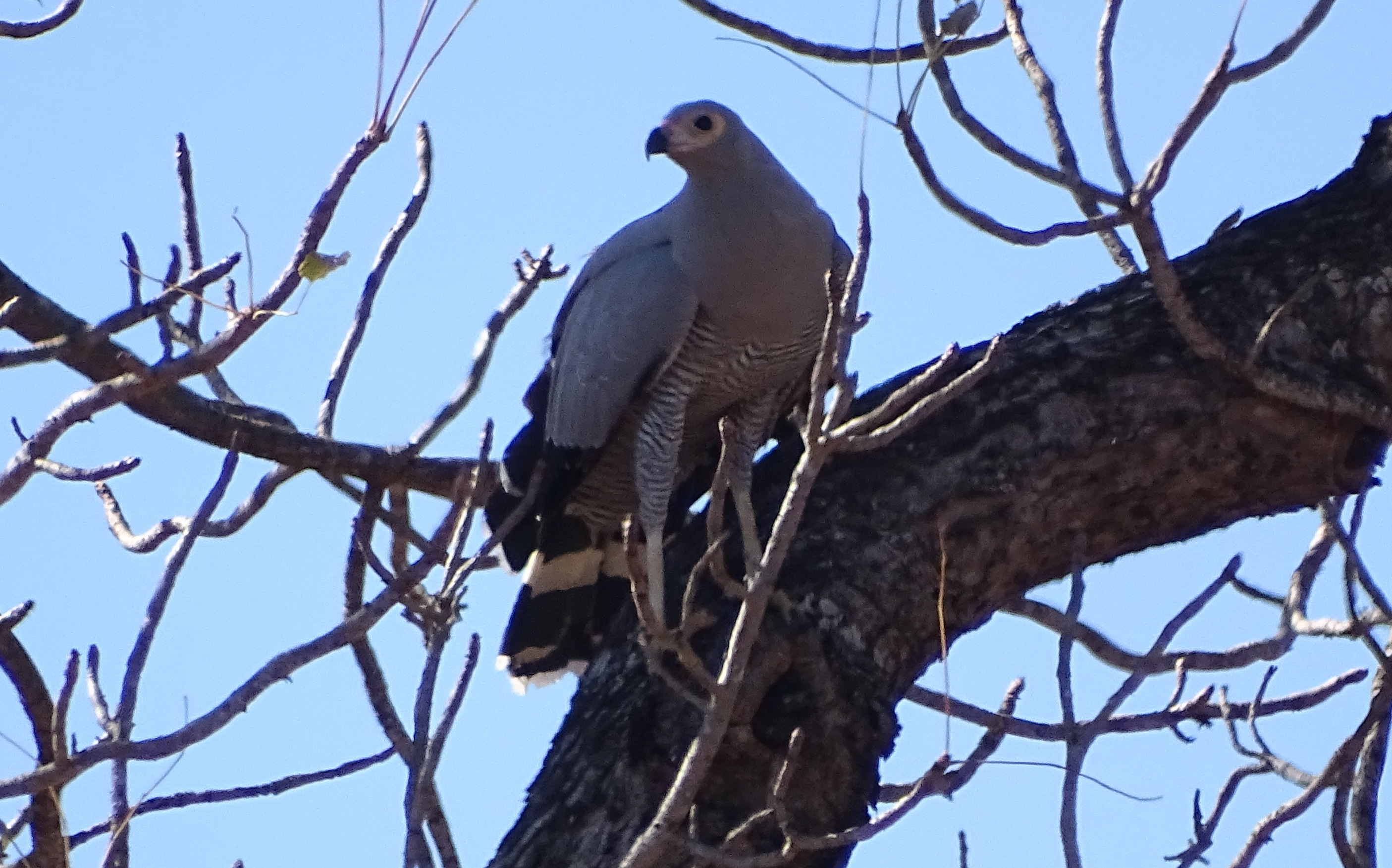
- near Mahaboboka
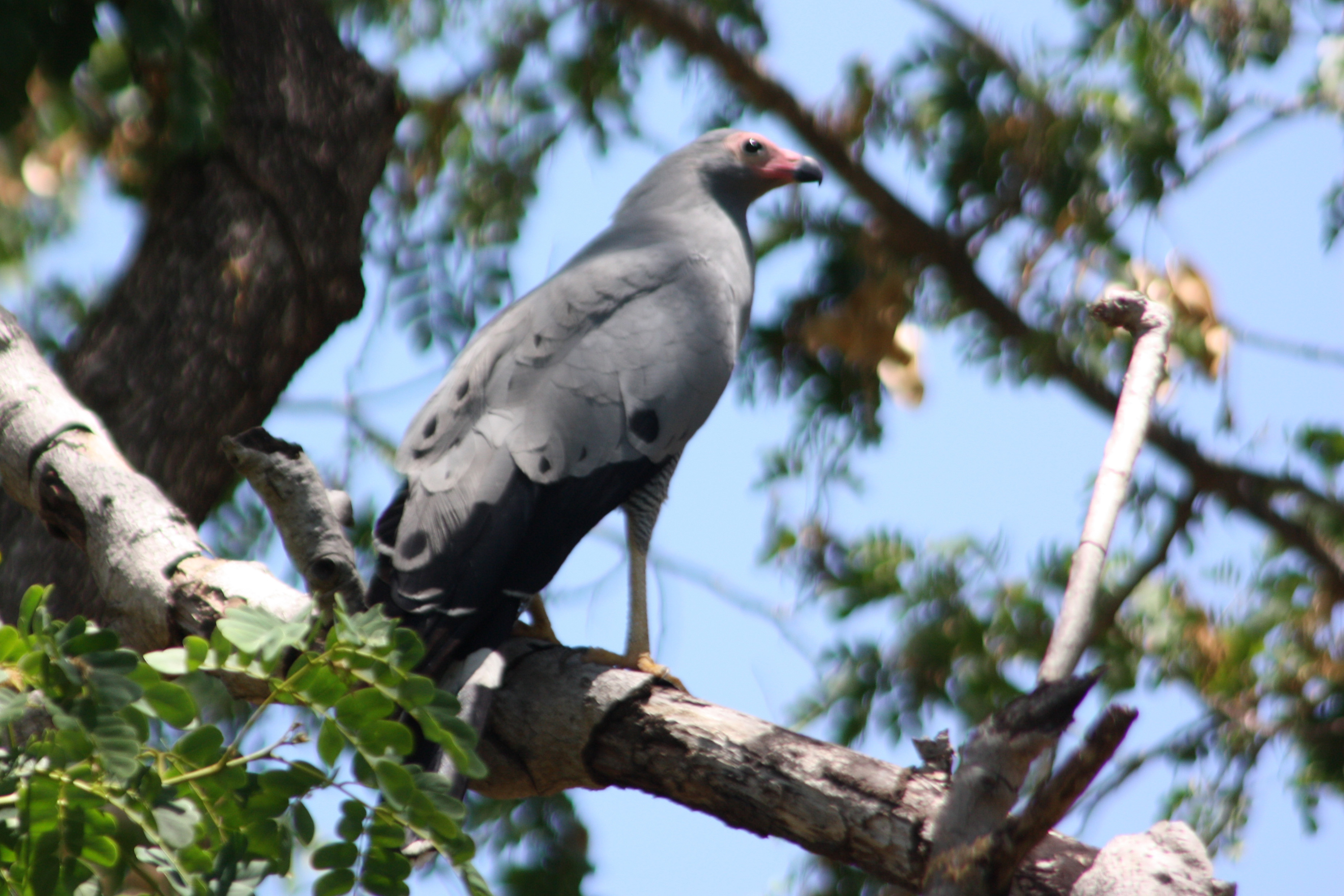
- in the Anjajavy Forest

Conservation status
- Least Concern (IUCN 3.1)

Scientific classification
- Kingdom: Animalia
- Phylum: Chordata
- Class: Aves
- Order: Accipitriformes
- Family: Accipitridae
- Genus: Polyboroides
- Species: P. radiatus

Binomial name
- Polyboroides radiatus (Scopoli, 1786)

= Madagascar harrier-hawk =

Species of bird

The Madagascar harrier-hawk (Polyboroides radiatus) is a medium-sized species of bird of prey in the family Accipitridae, endemic to Madagascar.

== Description ==
The Madagascar harrier-hawk is a medium-sized raptor with long and broad wings which when folded almost reach to the tip of the tail. It has a black tail with a single broad grey band bisecting the black half way along its length. Adult birds are grey above with blackish flight feathers. The underparts are white with dense dark barring on the breast, belly and underwing coverts while the upper breast and throat are the same colour as the upperparts and form a grey hood, broken by the yellow face. The bill is yellow with a black tip and the legs are yellow.

== Distribution ==
The Madagascar harrier-hawk is quite widespread and common, albeit in small numbers, in most regions of Madagascar but it is scarce on the deforested central plateau. It can be found from sea level to 2,000 m (6,600 ft) altitude.

== Habitat ==
The Madagascar harrier-hawk occurs in a variety of habitats but seems to favour undisturbed lowland rainforest. It has also been recorded from montane rainforest, spiny desert scrub, degraded forests and other wooded habitats, including plantations of exotic trees.

== Habits ==
The nest of the Madagascar harrier-hawk is a large, bulky structure which is constructed using sticks and situated approximately 18–30 m (59–98 ft) above the ground within the canopy of a tree. Nesting has been observed the months of September, October, and November. The eggs are brooded by both sexes and hatch asynchronously, with the older sibling often killing its younger brood mates. Fledging takes about seven weeks. On at least one occasion a nest was found within a colony of Sakalava weavers.

The Madagascar harrier-hawk has a varied diet and has been recorded eating small birds, rodents, reptiles, insects, small lemurs. Like the African harrier-hawk they possess the unusual morphological adaptation of having an intertarsal joint that allows their legs to flex backwards and forwards. This means that they can use their feet to probe and remove prey from hidden sites such as holes in tree trunks, weaver nests and rock crevices where they can extract nestling birds from such normally inaccessible places.

== Taxonomic notes ==
The Madagascar harrier-hawk forms a superspecies with the African harrier-hawk and has been regarded by some authorities as a subspecies of that species. However, if that is the case then the combined species would be called P. radiatus as this name has priority.

== Gallery ==
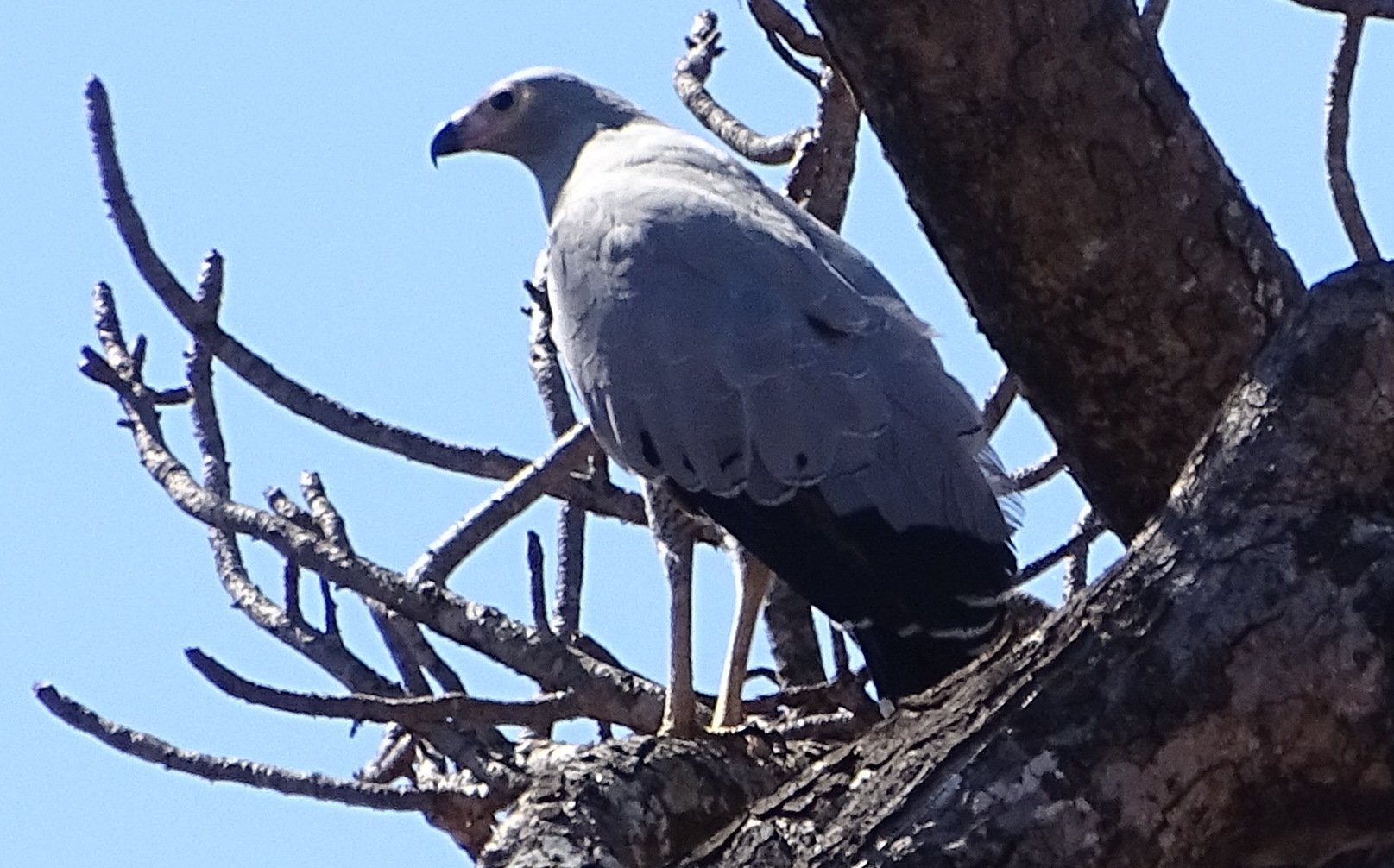
Near Mahaboboka

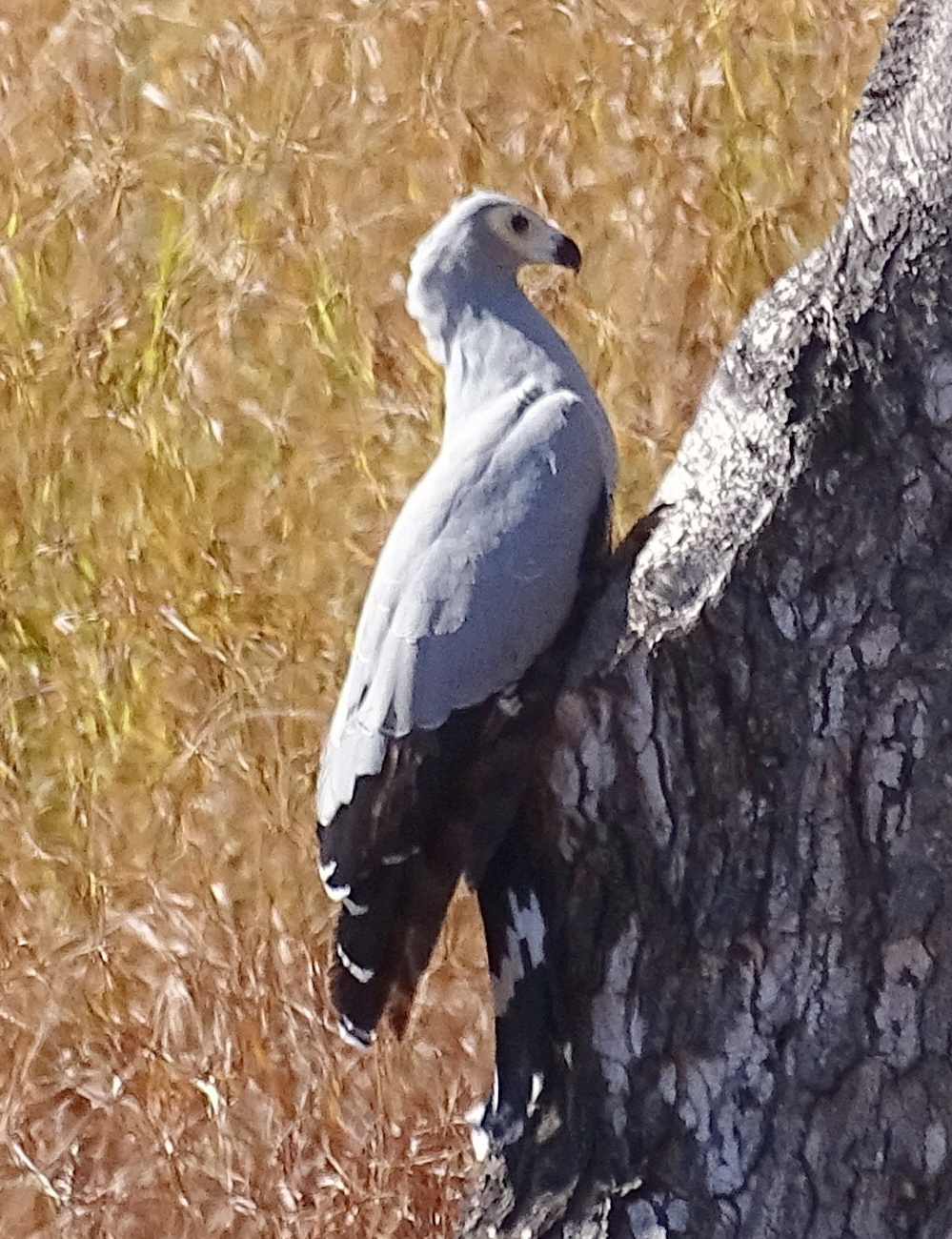
Near Mahaboboka

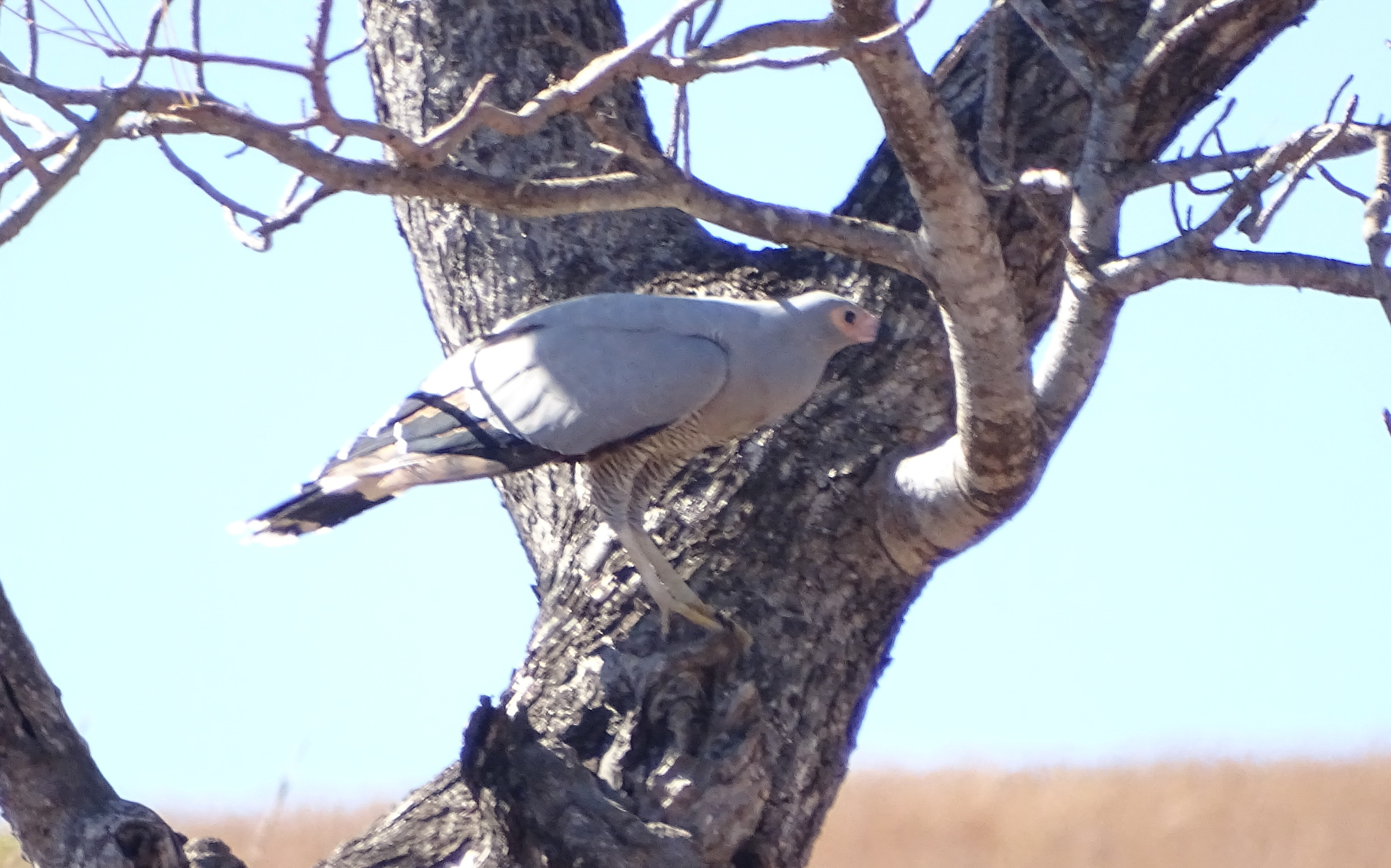
Near Mahaboboka

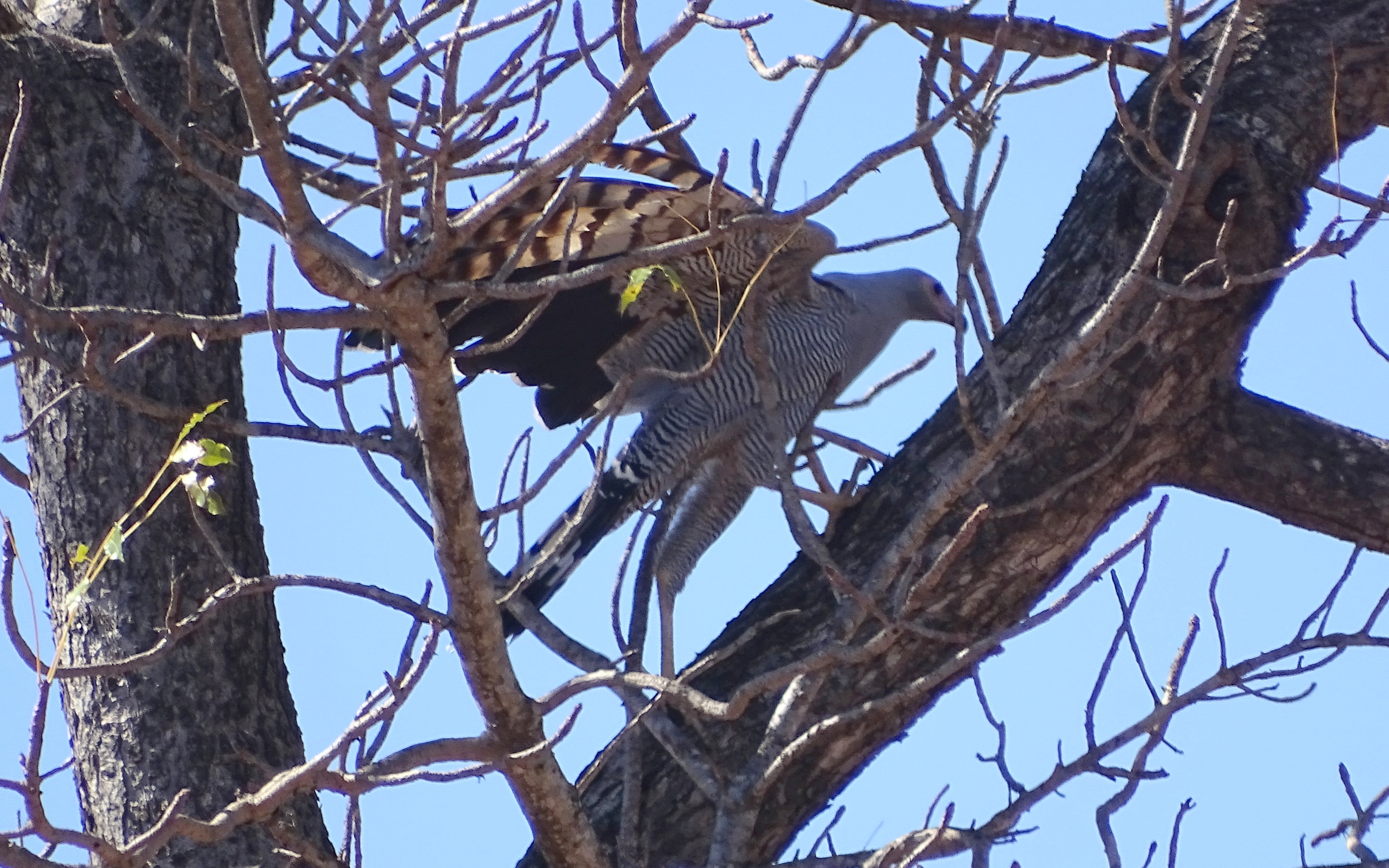
Showing striated underside of wing
