= Mahaboboka =

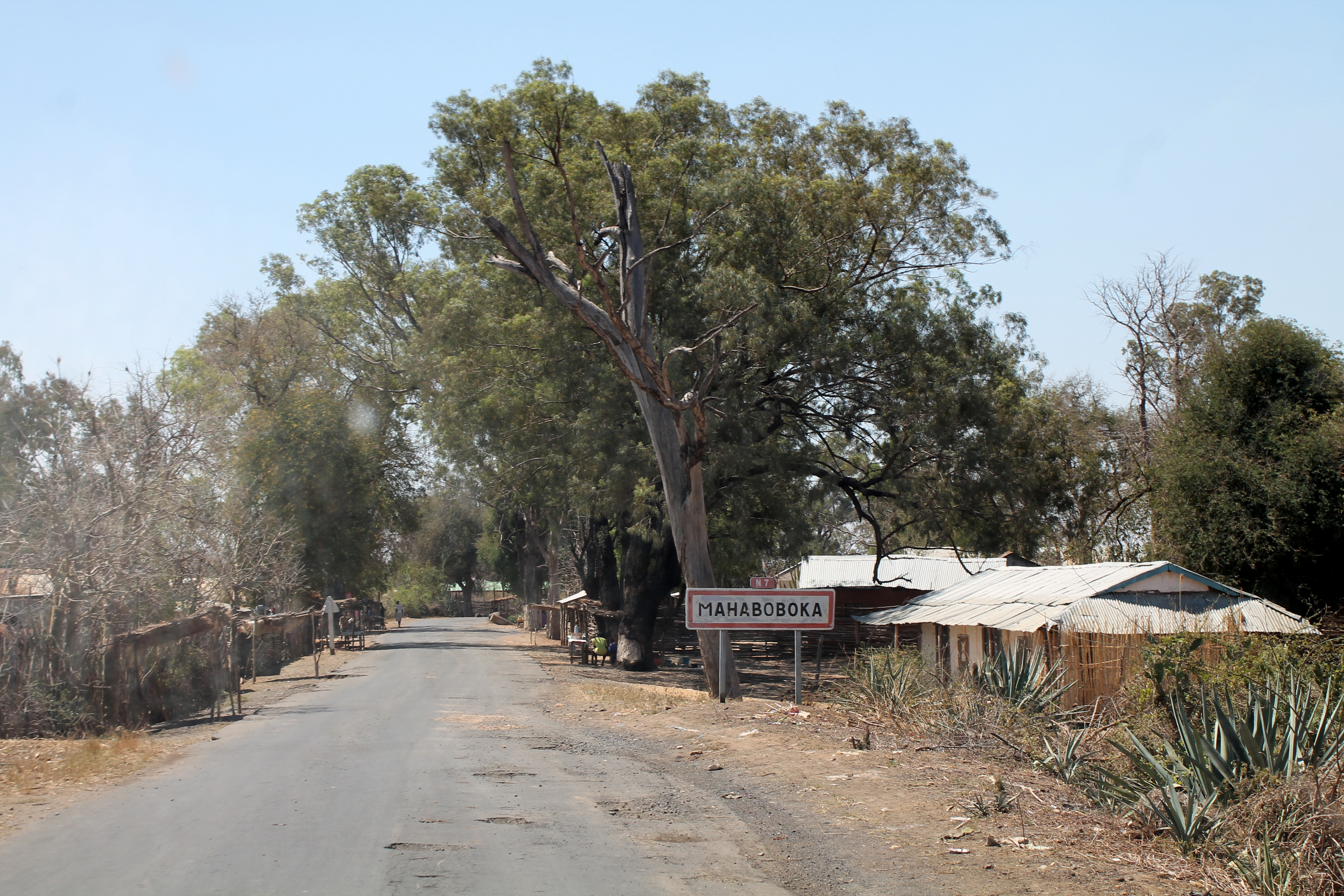
- Mahaboboka

- Location in Madagascar
- Coordinates: 22°54′S 44°20′E
- Country: Madagascar
- Region: Atsimo-Andrefana
- District: Sakaraha
- Elevation: 313 m (1,027 ft)

Population (2018)
  - Total: 13,115
- Time zone: UTC3 (EAT)

Mahaboboka is a town and commune (Malagasy: kaominina) in Madagascar. It belongs to the district of Sakaraha, which is a part of Atsimo-Andrefana Region. The population of the commune was estimated to be approximately 13,115 in 2018.

Primary and junior level secondary education are available in town. Mahaboboka has a police station, an Orthodox Church and a mosque. Traditional graves can be seen close to the road around Mahaboboka. The majority 80% of the population of the commune are farmers, while an additional 10% receives their livelihood from raising livestock. The most important crop is rice, while other important products are cassava and sweet potatoes. Services provide employment for 8% of the population. Additionally fishing employs 2% of the population.

== Geology ==
West of the Ilova fault, the Sakaraha–Toliara road crosses upper Jurassic marls and limestones. To the north, they have yielded ammonites, and to the north-west, they are succeeded by Cretaceous sedimentary rocks and basalts.

== Economy ==
Natural gas has been discovered in Mahaboboka in 2016.

Also minerals, as sapphires are found at Mahaboboka.

== Geography ==
Mahaboboka lies west of Sakaraha on the National Road 7, in the north-east from Tuléar.

=== Rivers ===
Mahaboboka lies at the Fiherenana River.

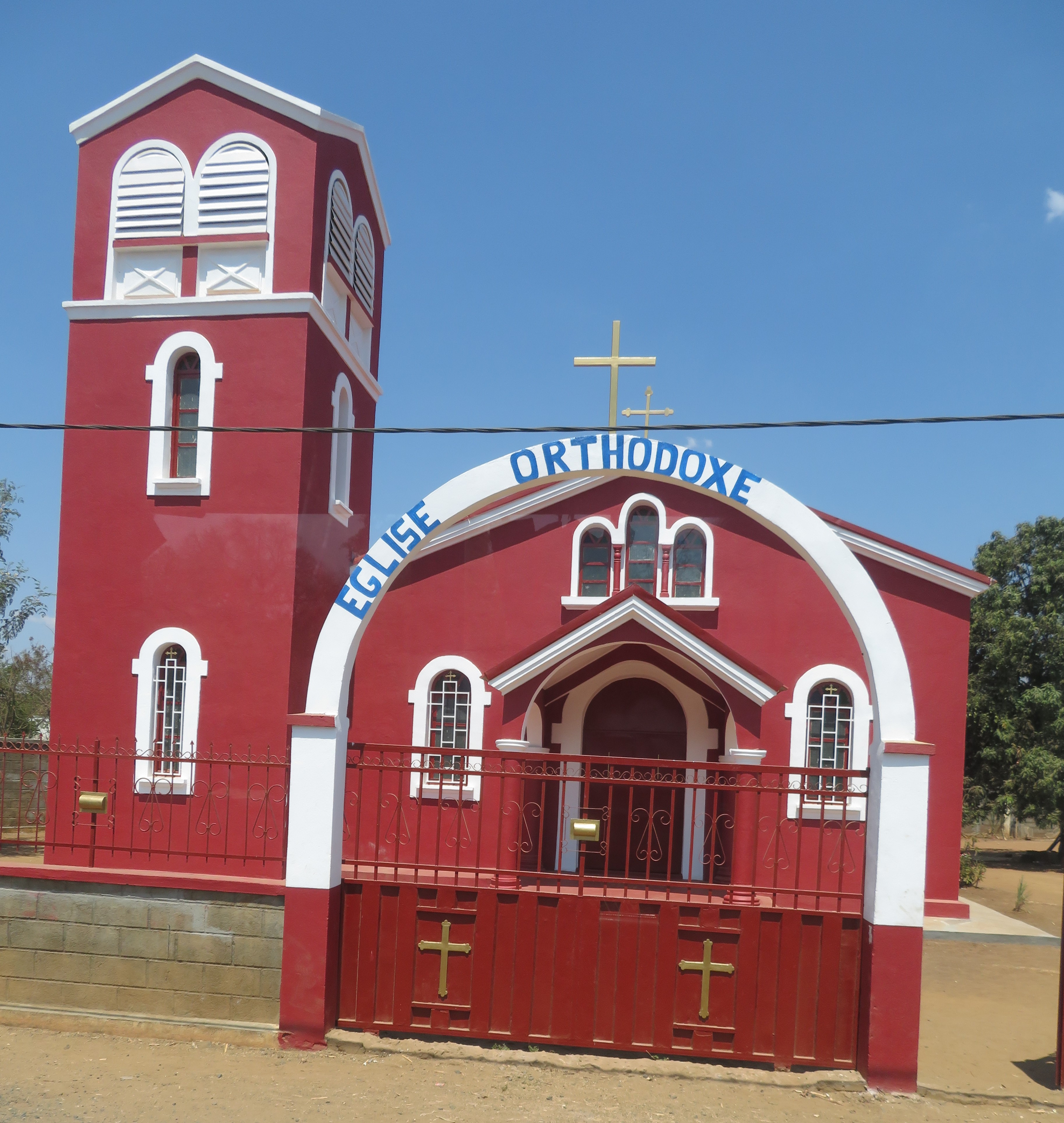
Orthodox church in Mahaboboka

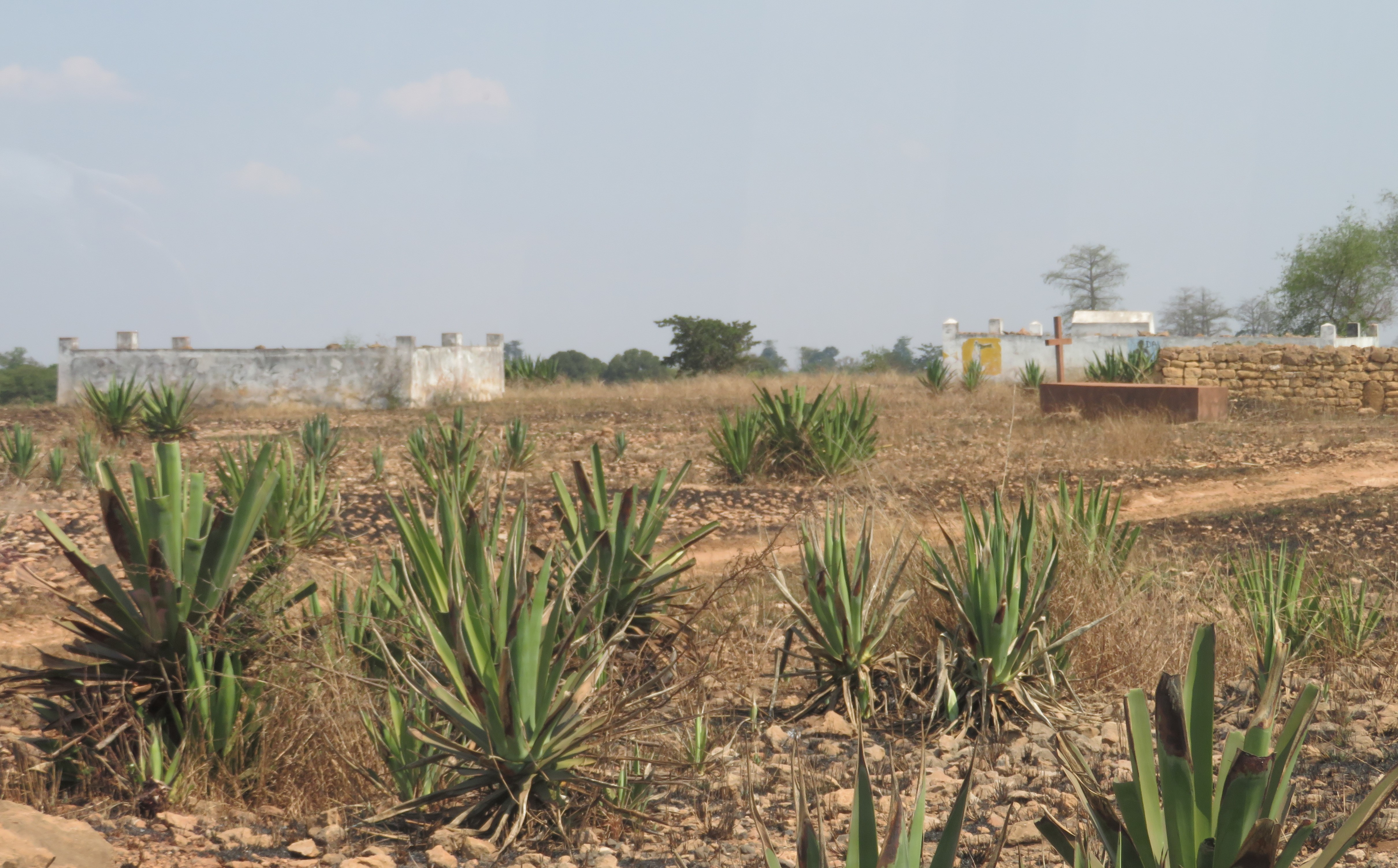
Traditional graves near Mahaboboka

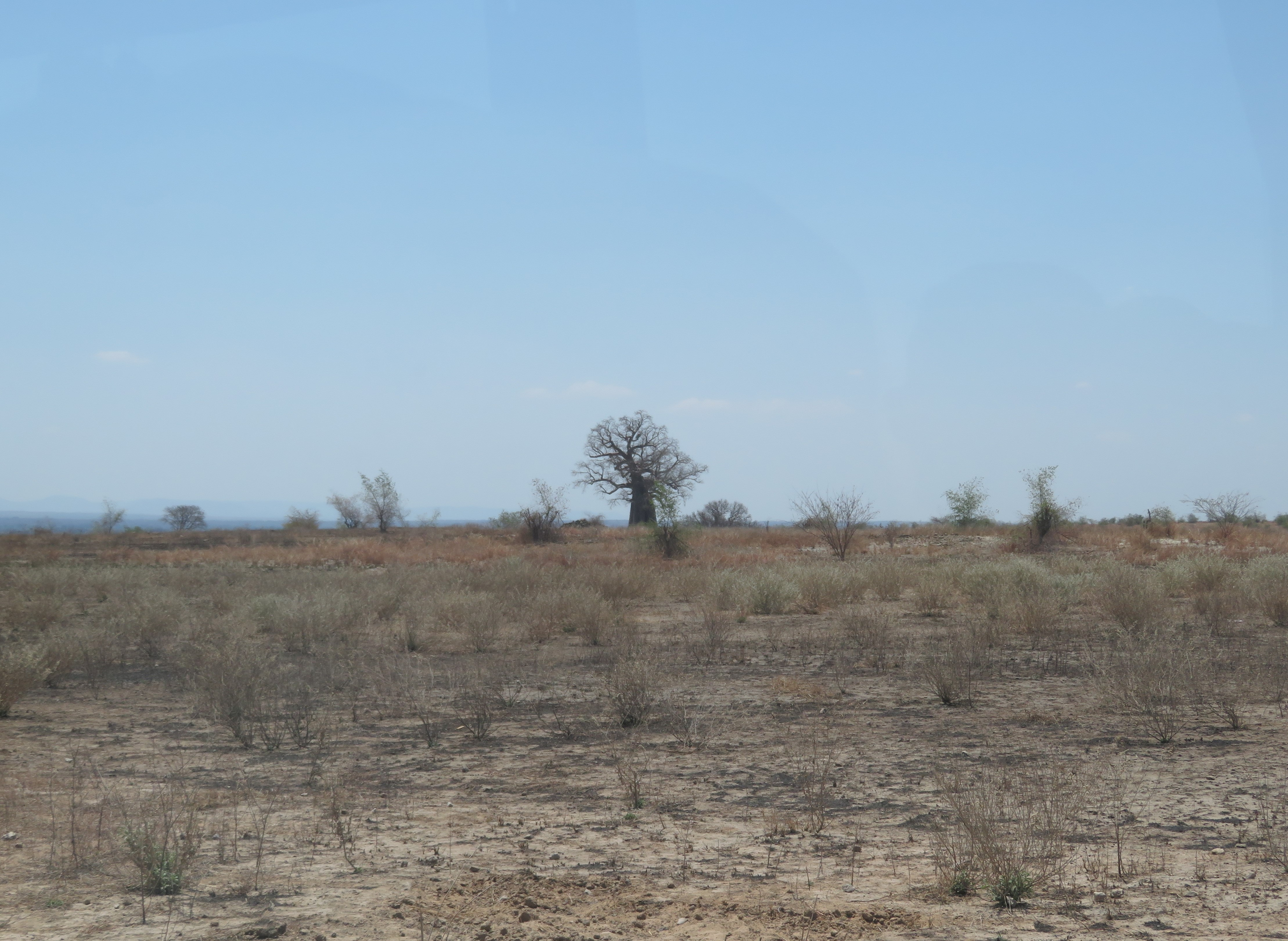
Typical landscape near Mahaboboka

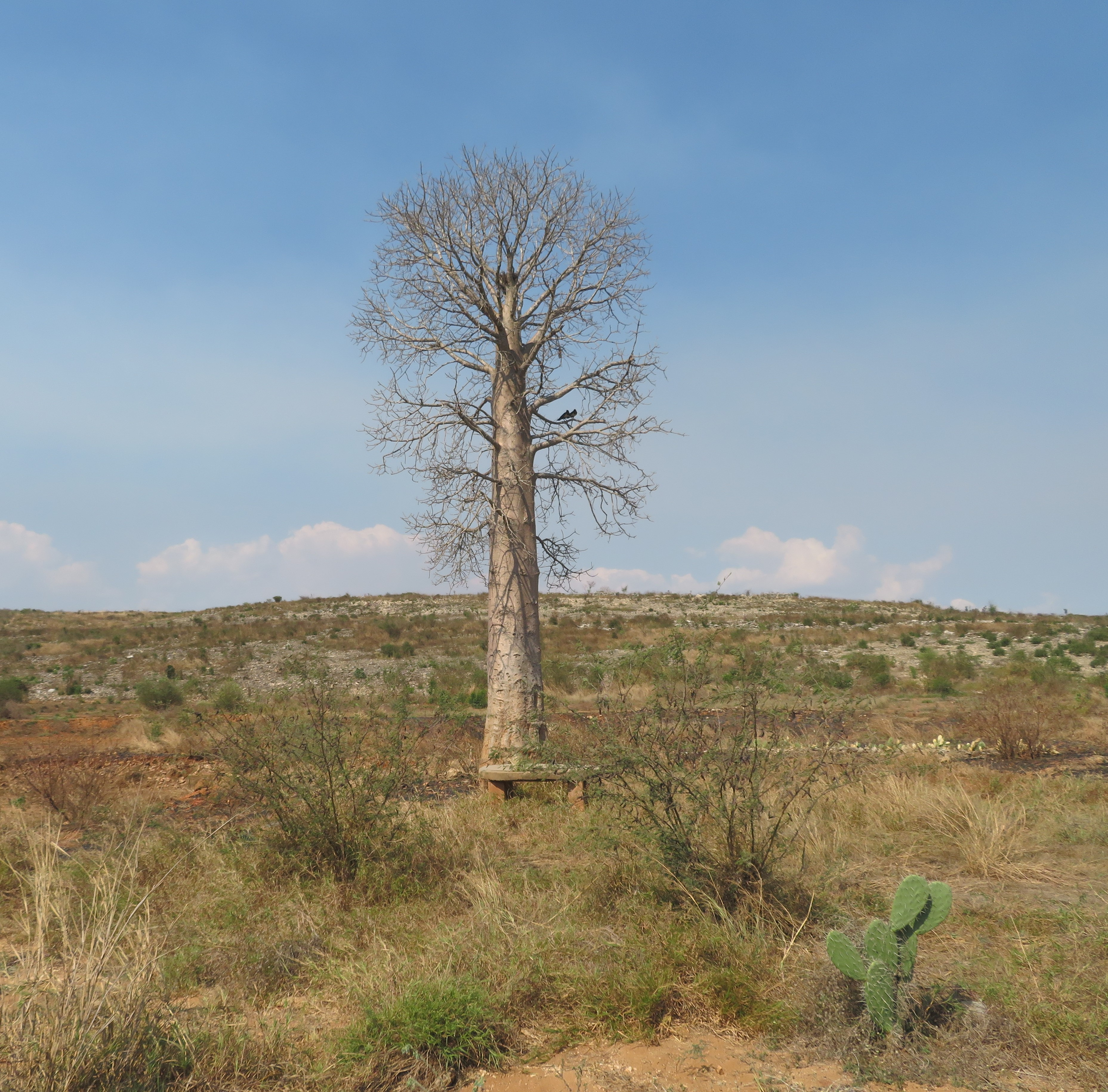
Typical vegetation near Mahaboboka
