= List of islands of Madagascar =

This is a tentative list of islands of Madagascar. This list is incomplete.

== Inhabited islands ==
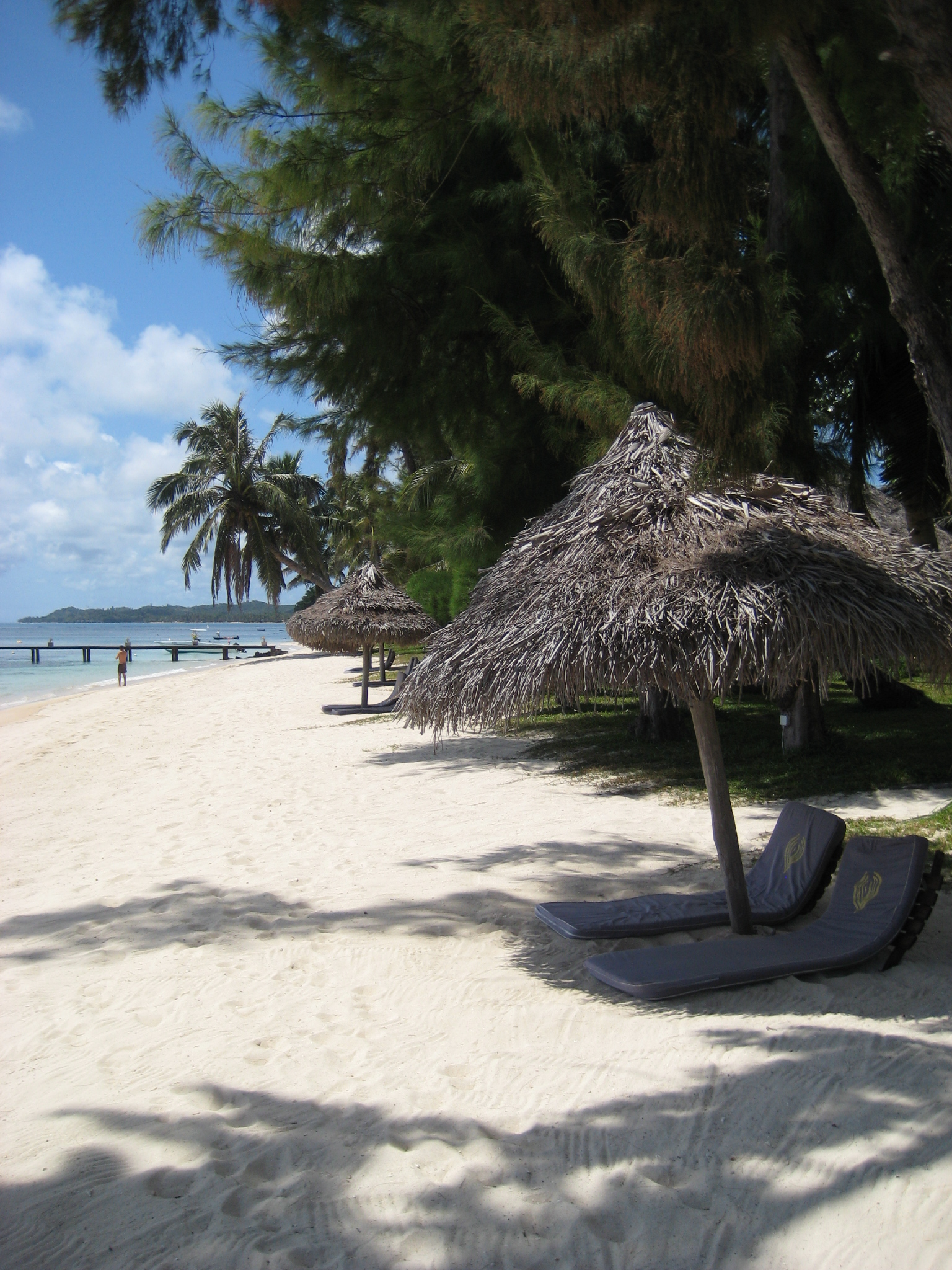
Beach, Nosy Boraha

- Ankify
- Barren Isles (Nosy Barren)
- Juan de Nova Island
- Île aux Nattes (Nosy Nato) (separated by 200m from Nosy Boraha (Analanjirofo)
- Île Sainte-Marie (Nosy Boraha), (Analanjirofo)
- Nosy Be, the Big Island in Diana
- Nosy Berafia - 10 km long and 3 km wide. Its chief town is Antananabe.
- Nosy Faly
- Nosy Hara National Park
- Nosy Komba (off Nosy Be, Diana)
- Nosy Kisimany (off Nosy Be, Diana)
- Nosy Mamoko (a former Arab trade post off Nosy Be)
- Nosy Mitsio
- Nosy Tanihely National Park
- Nosy Tsarabanjina
- Nosy Ve-Androka National Park (23°38’S, 43°42’E)

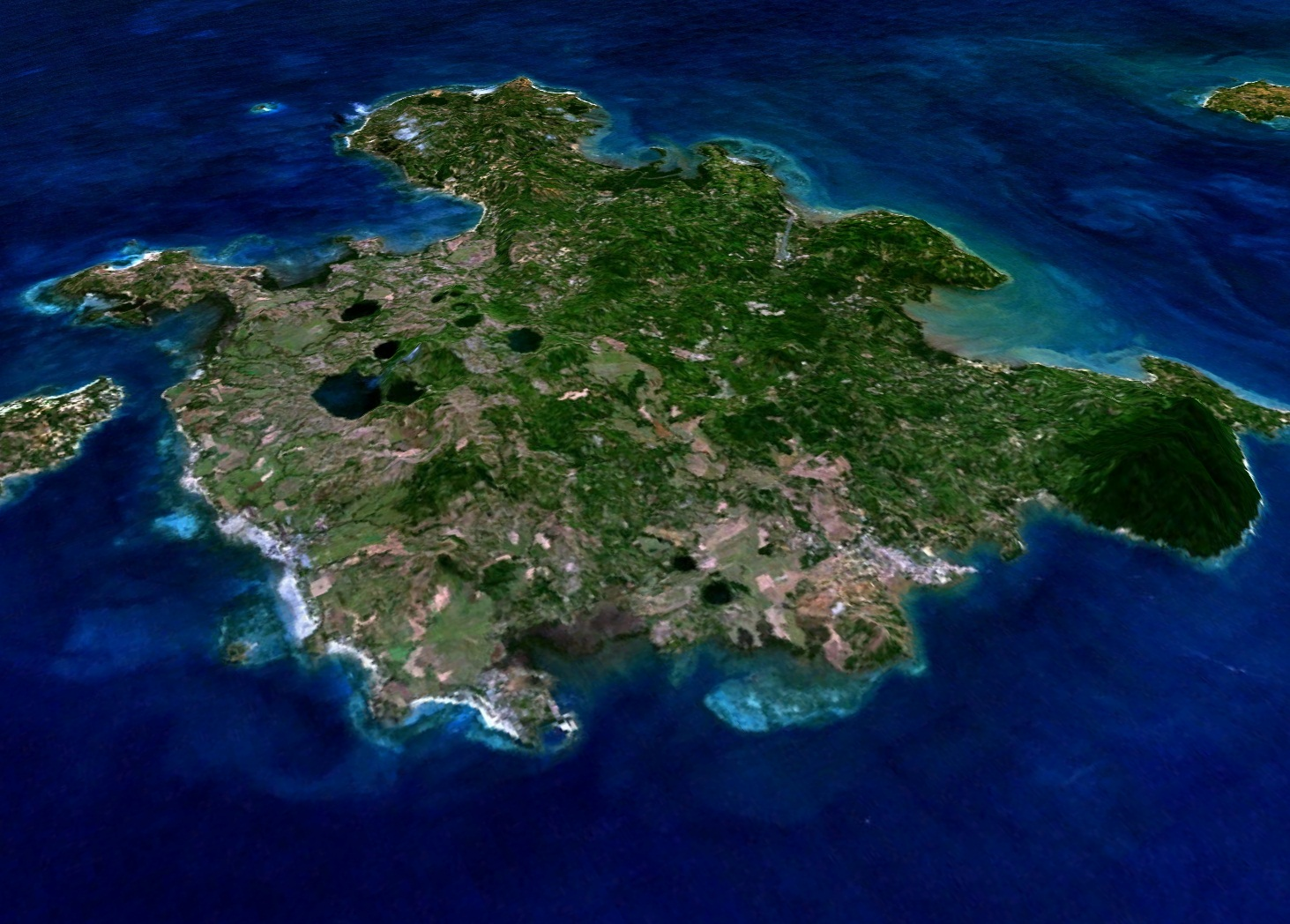
Nosy Be

== Uninhabited islands ==
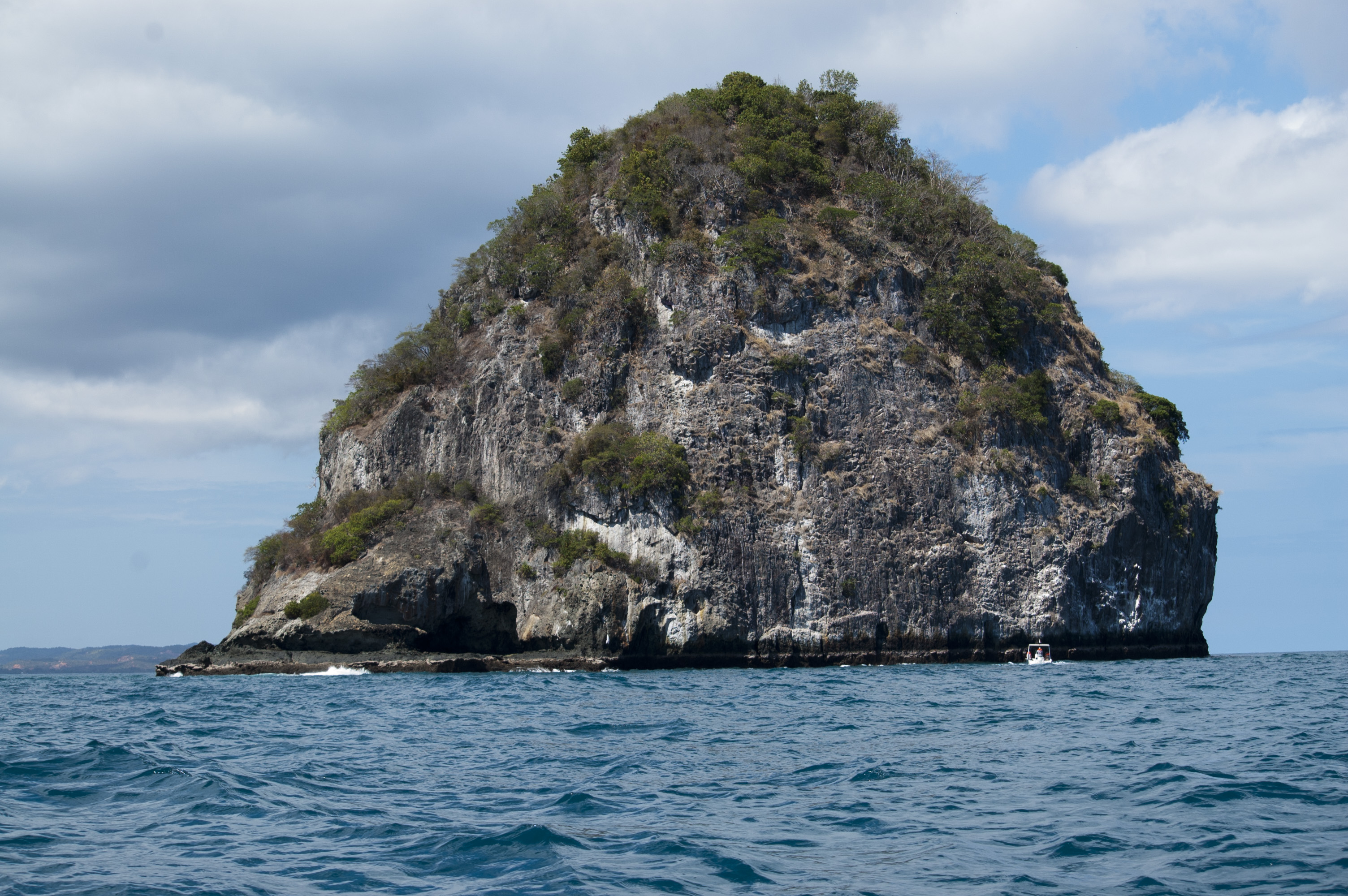
Nosy Kivongy

- Europa Island (Nosy Ampela)
- Grande Glorieuse
- Île du Lys
- Nosy Antalikely (in Diana)
- Nosy Antsoha (in Diana)
- Nosy Kivongy - a small rock off Nosy Be in Diana
- Nosy Mangabe - Antongil Bay, near Maroantsetra, Ambatosoa.
- Nosy Hara
- Nosy Tanihely - 341 ha. It is located 8.5 km South of Nosy Be.
- Nosy Ve-Androka National Park
- Nosy Antafana (in Ambatosoa, part of Mananara-Nord National Park)
- Nosy Hely (in Ambatosoa, part of Mananara-Nord National Park)
- Nosy Rangontsy (in Ambatosoa, part of Mananara-Nord National Park)
- Nosy Manitsa (also called: Nosy Manitse)- an island of 110 ha in the mouth of the Linta River, in Atsimo-Andrefana.
- Nosy Tanga - islet near Nosy Be, a local fady (tabou) prohibits to wear tangas.

== Unknown habitation status ==
- Nosindola (21°41’S, 43°20’E)
- Nosy Adramona (21°39’S, 43°22’E) (Translated: Ramona island). 30 ha, heights 15 m, North of Morombe about 6 km from cape Antsaramanefitra.
- Nosy Adranombala (21°57’S, 43°11’E) - 5 km from Cape Saint-Vincent, 50 ha, heights: 13 meters.
- Nosy Andambatihy (22°01’S, 43°14’E) : next to Nosy Ve. Accessible from Andabotibe, former site of Andavadoaka.
- Nosy Ankarea - (-12.8404092, 48.5749343) an island near Nosy Mitsio
- Nosy Antanimora - northern Madagascar, near Nosy Be
- Nosy Bemoka (22°00’S, 43°14’E) (translated: Island full of Mosquitos). South of Cape Saint-Vincent, in direction of Andavadoaka.
- Nosy Ovy or Nosy Barafia - northern Madagascar, near Nosy Be
- Nosy Bevato (translated: Big Rock island) - Bay of Tsingilofilo, south of Morombe
- Nosy Faly, northern Madagascar.
- Nosy Fasy (22°03’S, 43°11’E) (translated: Sandy island) North of Nosy Hao near Andavadoaka.
- Nosy Hao (22°05’S, 43°11’E) (translated: Savage island or Lices island). This island was named Sancti Jacobi on the map of Sanuto in 1588. Furthermore Murder’s Island by W. F. W. Owen in 1824 because of the murder of 2 sailors by the inhabitants. 2,2 km length and 400 m wide, 5,5 km before Andavadoaka.
- Nosy Iranja (translated: Turtle island) - northern Madagascar, 30 miles from Nosy Bé
- Nosy Lava (21°44’S, 43°18’E) (translated: Long island) - 70 ha, height 16 m, near Morombe Temporaly inhabited by some fishermen.
- Nosy Langobalana - small island near Nosy Hao, named also: île au Tombeau (Tombstone island). In 1824 two English sailors (Bowie and Parson) were buried here..
- Nosy Manitse (25°13’S, 44°14’E) (translated: Perfumed island; other names: Ilha do Nascimento by the Portuguese, île Leven by the English, par les Anglais) - 110 ha, situated in the Bay of Ampalaza, not far away from the mouth of the Linta River.
- Nosy Mborona (25°04’S, 44°02’E) (translated: Bird's island) - in the Linta River's mouth.
- Nosy Mivola (22°00’S, 43°14’E) (translated: island that speaks) - Cape Saint-Vincent.
- Nosy Ratafanika (21°49’S, 43°17’E) small island at Cape Saint-Vincent. Length approx. 2 km x 200m. Forms an archipelago with Nosy Fatra, Nosy Andriamandriaka and Nosy Andamonty.
- Nosy Satrana (23°38’S, 43°42’E) (translated: Palm island) - uninhabited, 50 ha.
- Nosy Tarafa - facing Tulear near Sarodrano.
- Nosy Timpoy (21°46’S, 43°18’E) - south of Nosy Lava.
- Nosy Tsarabanjina - northern Madagascar, near Nosy Mitsio. A lodge is situated on this island.
- Nosy Vato (between 23°14’S and 23’21’S, 43°42’E). (translated: Rock island) - in the mouth of the Fiherenana River

== Disputed island territories ==
=== Uninhabited ===
- Scattered Islands in the Indian Ocean
  - Includes Bassas da India atoll; administered as part of Overseas France – though continuously claimed as Malagasy territory
