= Nosy Tanikely National Park =

National park in Madagascar

Nosy Tanihely National Park
- Location within Madagascar
- Location: Madagascar
- Coordinates: 13°28′58″S 48°14′12″E
- Area: 341 ha (840 acres)
- Governing body: Madagascar National Parks Association

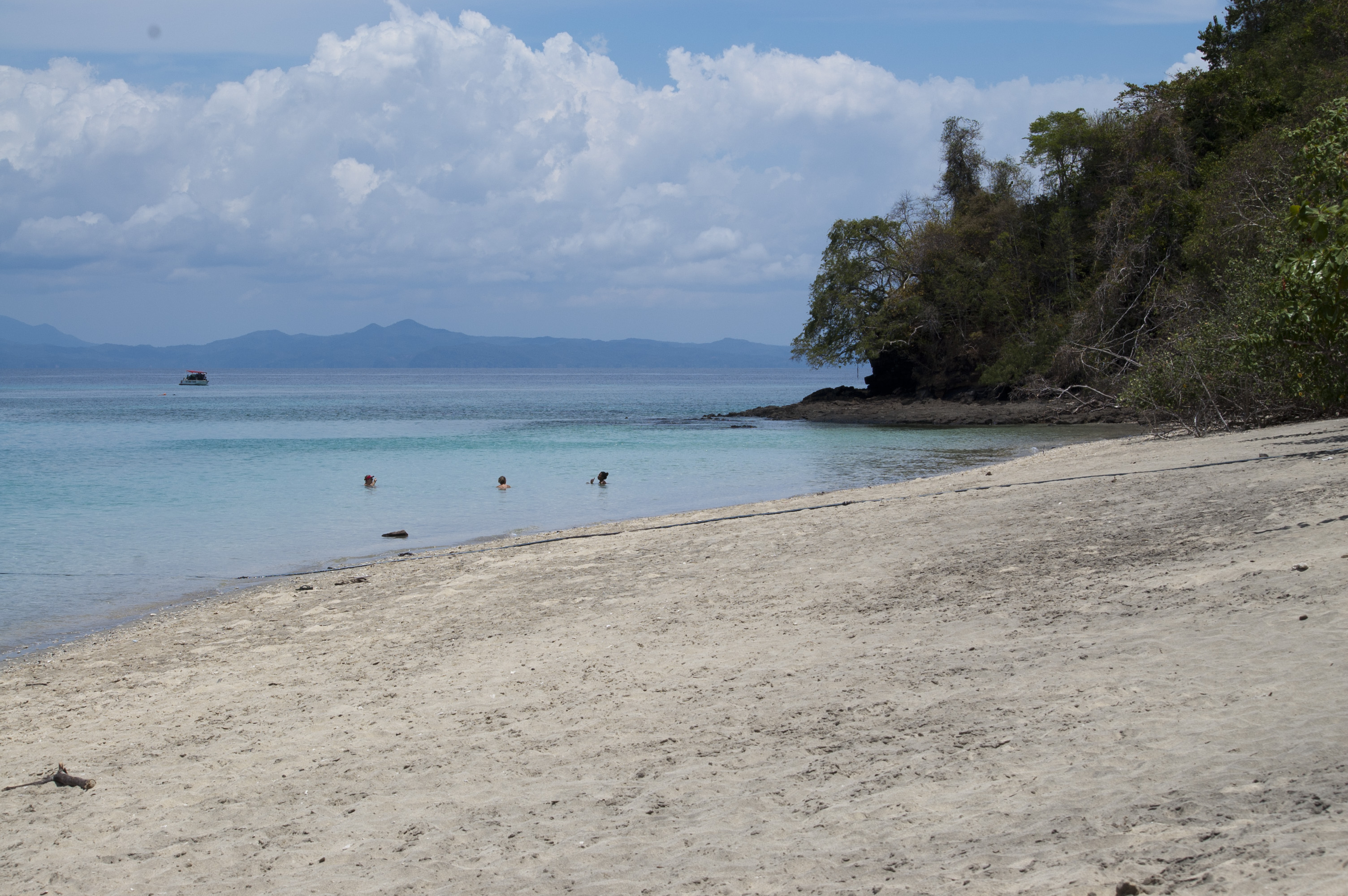
Nosy Tanikely

The Nosy Tanikely National Park in a national park on the island of Nosy Tanikely and covers an area of 341 ha. It is located 8.5 km south of Nosy Be and west of Nosy Komba.

== Area and Classification ==
Nosy Tanikely National Park is a small island covering an area of 3.41 km^{2} (1.32 sq mi), which explains its name: "Nosy Tanikely" means "island of the small land" in French. Sometimes, it is also referred to as "Tanihely," which carries the same meaning as Tanikely but differs due to a spelling variation. The park was officially established by decree on September 6, 2011.

== Location ==
The island is located in the northwest of Madagascar, approximately 8 kilometers south of the island of Nosy Be. The entire island and the surrounding sea are part of Nosy Tanikely National Park. As such, the island is protected and it is forbidden to remove any animals from it, such as chameleons.

== Climate ==
Nosy Tanikely has a tropical climate characterized by consistently high temperatures and humidity throughout the year. Temperatures typically range between 21°C (70°F) and 31°C (88°F), with an average around 26°C (79°F). This climate creates warm and humid conditions year-round. The island's summit reaches an altitude of 40 meters (130 feet), making it a relatively high point above sea level.

== Biodiversity ==
Nosy Tanikely is nicknamed "the natural aquarium". Its waters teem with vividly colored fish, dazzling corals enhanced by the hues of anemones, including clownfish, lionfish, crocodilefish, batfish, moray eels, trevallies, barracudas, Spanish mackerels, and blue-spotted stingrays. This exceptional diversity enhances the turquoise waters of this true paradise. The island also hosts green turtles and hawksbill sea turtles, further enriching its ecological appeal.

The island's panther chameleons represent a completely isolated local form distinct from mainland and other island populations. Male panther chameleons of Nosy Tanikely are particularly vibrant, displaying unique coloration patterns not found in neighboring islands. They feature striking blue and turquoise bands, with bright-colored heads and bodies speckled with red dots. When fatigued, stressed, or overheated by the sun, their turquoise body bands partially transform into vivid orange.

In January–May and November–December, evidence of nesting activity from marine species can be observed on the beaches of this National Marine Park. On average, a female turtle can lay up to 190 eggs per clutch. These eggs hatch after approximately 90 days with a remarkable 95% success rate.
