= Anitry Ny Aina Ratsifandrihamanana =

Malagasy conservationist

Anitry Ny Aina Ratsifandrihamanana (Nanie)
- Education: Ecole Normale Supérieure, Antananarivo and Cornell University, Ithaca.
- Occupation: conservationist

Anitry Ny Aina Ratsifandrihamanana (Nanie) is a Malagasy conservationist and is the country director of WWF Madagascar and western Indian Ocean Islands.

== Biography ==
Ratsifandrihamanana studied English literature at the Ecole Normal Supérieure at the University of Antananarivo, but has always had an interest in nature. Her involvement in conservation began in the early 1990s when she was employed as an administrator on the USAID-funded project to establish Ranomafana National Park. She then went to the US to study Environmental Education & Communication at Cornell University. She specialises on the dry spiny forests of southern Madagascar, but now works on conservation across the country.

Ratsifandrihamanana started working for WWF Madagascar in 1999, working as conservation director from 2004 to 2013. In this capacity, she had a leading role in the implementation of the "Durban Vision" which resulted in the tripling of Madagascar's protected area network as she co-led the Malagasy Protected Area Commission over the critical years of 2005–2009.

In 2014, Ratsifandrihamanana took over the role of Country Director of WWF Madagascar and western Indian Ocean Islands. She is the first Malagasy national to hold this position and is only the second national to represent WWF in Madagascar since Vaohita Barthélémy held this position in 1987.

From 2008 to 2011 Ratsifandrihamanana also served on the board of quasi-governmental body responsible for protected area management; Madagascar National Parks. From 2019 she has been serving as the vice-president of the Madagascar Protected areas and Biodiversity Trust Fund (a $70 million endowment to provide sustainable funding for Madagascar's protected area network). She is also a member of the IUCN World Commission on protected areas.

Ratsifandrihamanana is on the Board of Directors of the conservation organisation Association VAHATRA.

== Advocacy ==
Ratsifandrihamanana has been an outspoken critic of Madagascar's illegal wildlife trade and of exploitation of rosewood within protected areas.
