= 13th parallel =

13th parallel may refer to:

- 13th parallel north, a circle of latitude in the Northern Hemisphere
- 13th parallel south, a circle of latitude in the Southern Hemisphere
