= 15th parallel =

15th parallel may refer to:

- 15th parallel north, a circle of latitude in the Northern Hemisphere
- 15th parallel south, a circle of latitude in the Southern Hemisphere
