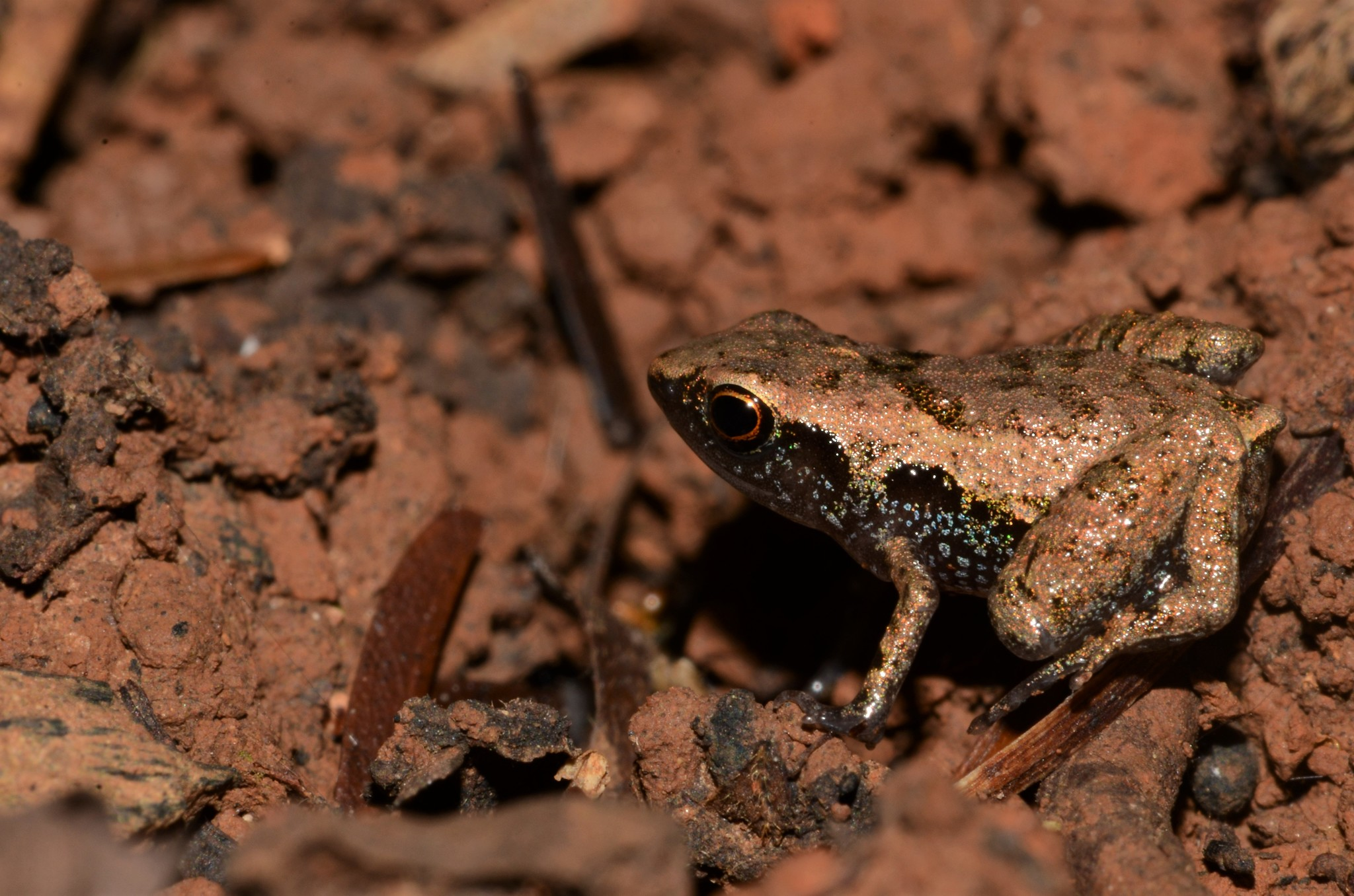

Conservation status
- Endangered (IUCN 3.1)

Scientific classification
- Kingdom: Animalia
- Phylum: Chordata
- Class: Amphibia
- Order: Anura
- Family: Microhylidae
- Subfamily: Cophylinae
- Genus: Stumpffia
- Species: S. pygmaea

Binomial name
- Stumpffia pygmaea Vences & Glaw, 1991

Synonyms
- Rhombophryne pygmaea Peloso et al., 2016

= Stumpffia pygmaea =

Species of frog

Stumpffia pygmaea is a species of frog in the family Microhylidae. It is endemic to Madagascar, where it is known from only two islands, Nosy Be and Nosy Komba. Its natural habitats are subtropical or tropical moist lowland forests, plantations.

Male Stumpffia pygmaea have a snout–vent length of 10–12.5 mm (0.39–0.49 in), and females a snout-vent length of 11 mm (0.43 in). Stumpffia pygmaea is a terrestrial microhylid frog.

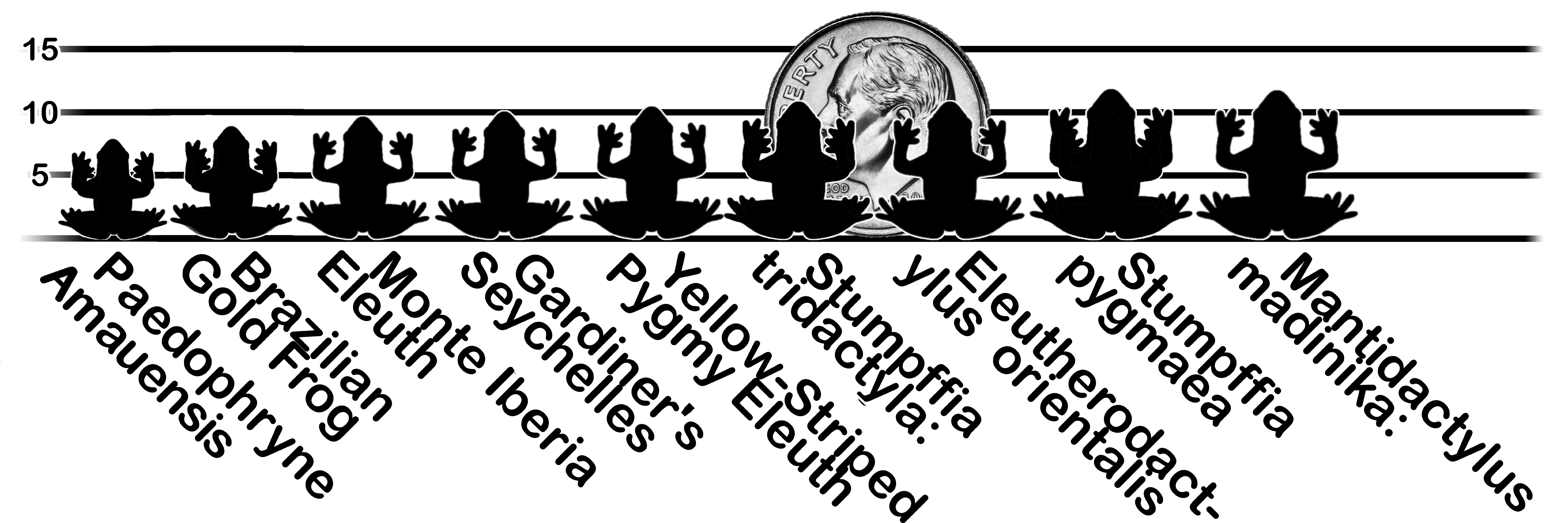
