= 14th parallel =

14th parallel may refer to:

- 14th parallel north, a circle of latitude in the Northern Hemisphere
- 14th parallel south, a circle of latitude in the Southern Hemisphere
