= 12th parallel =

12th parallel may refer to:

- 12th parallel north, a circle of latitude in the Northern Hemisphere
- 12th parallel south, a circle of latitude in the Southern Hemisphere

== See also ==
- Circle of latitude
