= 11th parallel =

11th parallel may refer to:

- 11th parallel north, a circle of latitude in the Northern Hemisphere
- 11th parallel south, a circle of latitude in the Southern Hemisphere
