= Girl Friday (TV programme) =

British TV programme

- Genre: Travel documentary
- Directed by: Michael Houldey
- Presented by: Joanna Lumley
- Country of origin: United Kingdom
- Original language: English
- No. of episodes: 1

Production
- Producer: Clive Tulloh
- Running time: 60 minutes

Original release
- Network: BBC One
- Release: 26 November 1994

Related
- Billy Connolly: A Scot in the Arctic (1995); Cast Away (2023–)

Girl Friday is a 1994 BBC reality television special, starring Joanna Lumley in which she spends nine days on the desert island of Tsarabanjina near Madagascar. Lumley wrote an accompanying book, also called Girl Friday, which was published by BBC Books.

The title is based on the idiom derived from Friday, a character in Robinson Crusoe.

== Synopsis ==
Actress Joanna Lumley spends nine days on an uninhabited desert island, with just a basic survival kit. This kit includes two knives, some rudimentary cooking equipment, some rice and vegetable stock cubes, matches, writing materials and fishing equipment. Some of the programme is recorded by a film crew, who leave the island at night. Other segments are recorded by Lumley herself, after the film crew have left.

== Development ==
In late 1993, freelance television producer Clive Tulloh was commissioned to create a television special, with the description: "Joanna Lumley survives on a desert island." According to Tulloh, he was briefed to produce something with "a touch of pre-Christmas escapism" that would "cheer people up on a dark winter's night."

At the time, Lumley had become a popular TV personality, with her portrayal of Patsy Stone in the BBC comedy series Absolutely Fabulous. She had also previously appeared in a 1991 BBC travel documentary, In Search of the White Rajahs, in which she travelled to Malaysia to examine the story of the British rulers of the kingdom of Sarawak. Initially, she was approached to take part in Girl Friday as Patsy Stone, but Lumley only wanted to appear in the programme as herself.

One of the challenging tasks was finding the best location for the programme. It took three months before Tulloh settled on the Malagasy island of Tsarabanjina, off the northwest coast of Madagascar. At the time of broadcast, the island was uninhabited, although it has since been partially developed into a luxury resort. Some fishermen from a nearby island did regularly camp on Tsarabanjina, and were paid to vacate the island for the duration of filming. Securing use of the island also involved negotiations with nine government ministries, as well as local leaders.

When the location was confirmed, a survival specialist was brought in to stay on the island, to assess the risks posed by the wildlife. Joanna Lumley completed a two-day survival course with the Irish Guards in preparation.

== Production ==
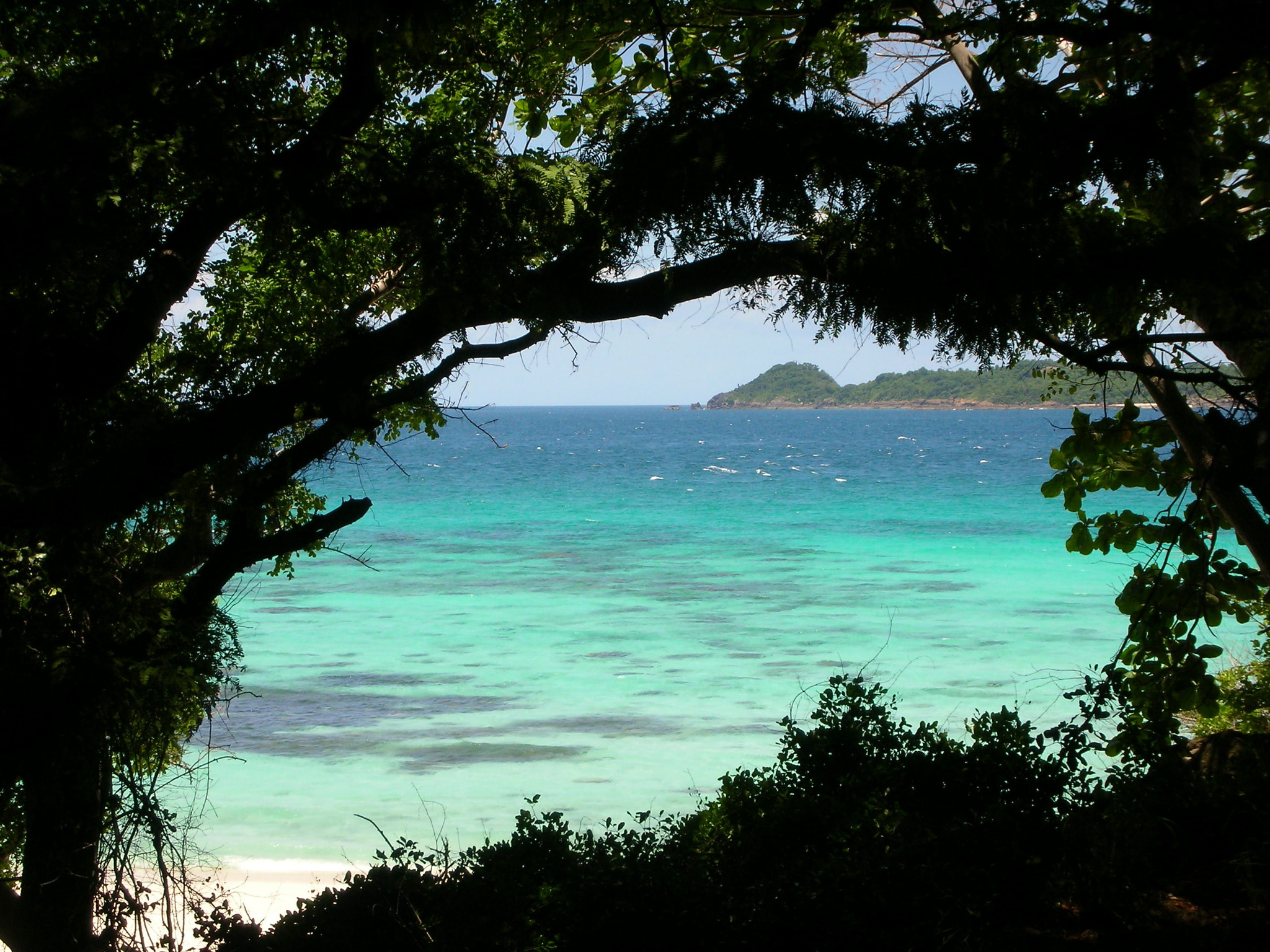
View from part of the island

During the course of filming, the film unit was accommodated on a luxury ship, the Fantasy. The ship had round-the-clock security, as details of the location had been leaked in the tabloid press a few days prior to their arrival.

Tulloh had a 10-day shooting schedule for the programme. For the first few days, heavy rainfall affected the shoot, and on the third day, the film crew were completely prevented from landing on the island due to sea conditions. Crew members also began to suffer from trench foot, as did Lumley herself. On the eighth day, the weather changed dramatically, causing Lumley to collapse from the high temperatures. Tulloh summarised the experience as a "mind-numbingly hard time."

== Release ==
Girl Friday was first broadcast on BBC One on Saturday 26 November 1994, at 8.15pm. It has been since repeated multiple times on BBC Four. The programme was also released on VHS, and a 20th anniversary edition came out on DVD in 2014.

Writing in The Times, Ros Drinkwater praised Lumley's role in the programme, stating: "Lumley carried the day, showing not only a fine talent for survival, but a nice line in inventiveness." Drinkwater highlighted the self-shot video segments, as giving "an interesting glimpse of the woman behind the glamorous image." David Flusfeder found the programme "rather engaging", largely because of Lumley's role, describing her as "good company, in an Enid Blyton sort of way." The Sunday Times reviewer A. A. Gill was less impressed, describing the show as "uneventful and most of the time plain dull."

When the show was re-broadcast in 2008, Gabrielle Starkey gave it another positive review in The Times, writing that Lumley's "resourcefulness and cheer under trying circumstances came as something of a surprise, and made for must-see TV."

Lumley wrote a book to accompany the series, also with the title Girl Friday, which was published in the same year by BBC Books. The book is written in diary format, describing Lumley's experience of both the island and the film crew. Reviewing the book for The Sunday Times, Lucy Irvine thought "the text reads gracefully and contains some nice wit," with Lumley's honesty being "endearing".

== Legacy ==
The programme's initial success encouraged Clive Tulloh to produce further similar shows. In 1995, he created Billy Connolly: A Scot in the Arctic, in which the Scottish comedian Billy Connolly spent a week in the Arctic. He also went on to work with Joanna Lumley on several other documentaries, including journeys to India, Japan and the Trans-Siberian Railway.

During an appearance at the 2018 Edinburgh TV Festival, Lumley described her time on Girl Friday as "the toughest thing I’ve ever done, and the happiest." She showed the audience a bag of items that she had kept, including a bag of rice, a knife, a shell, and a pair of shoes she had made out of her bra. Referring to these items, she said: "These are the only things that I’ve asked to be buried with me when I die."

Following her experiences, Ruby Wax asked Lumley for advice when she appeared in a 2023 Channel 5 television programme with a similar premise, Ruby Wax: Cast Away. For this programme, which was also produced by Clive Tulloh, Wax spent 10 days on the uninhabited island of Ankerea, off the coast of Madagascar. In an interview with The Times, Wax said: "The most useful thing I had from [Joanna Lumley] was a copy of her book — I didn't read it, I used it for killing bugs. Every time I slammed it down it was like a blood bath." On 25 September 2024, it was announced that Phillip Schofield would return to television in the next installment of the programme, aired over three 60-minute episodes, which would begin later that month on the channel.
