= Andoany =

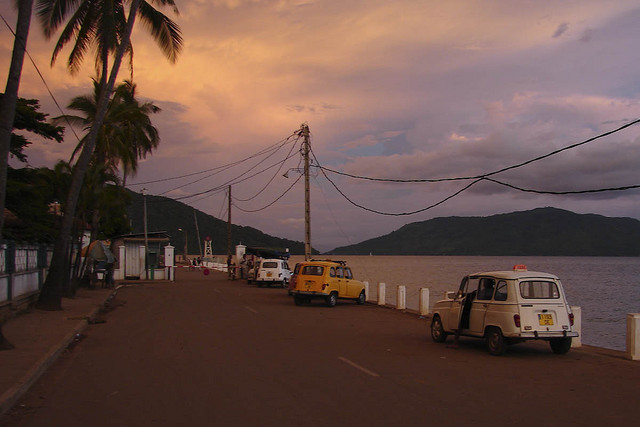
- Andoany docks at dusk
- Nickname: Hell-Ville
- Location in Madagascar
- Coordinates: 13°24′0″S 48°16′0″E
- Country: Madagascar
- Region: Diana
- District: Nosy Be

Population (2013)
  - Total: 39,500
- Time zone: UTC3 (East Africa Time (EAT))

Andoany, formerly and more commonly known as Hell-Ville (after Anne Chrétien Louis de Hell), is a city in Diana Region, Madagascar, with a population estimated at 39,500 in 2013. It lies on the island of Nosy Be, of which it is the capital. It is located at 13°24′0″S 48°16′0″E.
