= Nosy Ve-Androka National Park =

Protected Marine Area of Madagascar

- Location within Madagascar
- Location: Madagascar
- Coordinates: 25°40′S 45°0′E
- Area: 91,445 ha (225,970 acres)
- Governing body: Madagascar National Parks Association

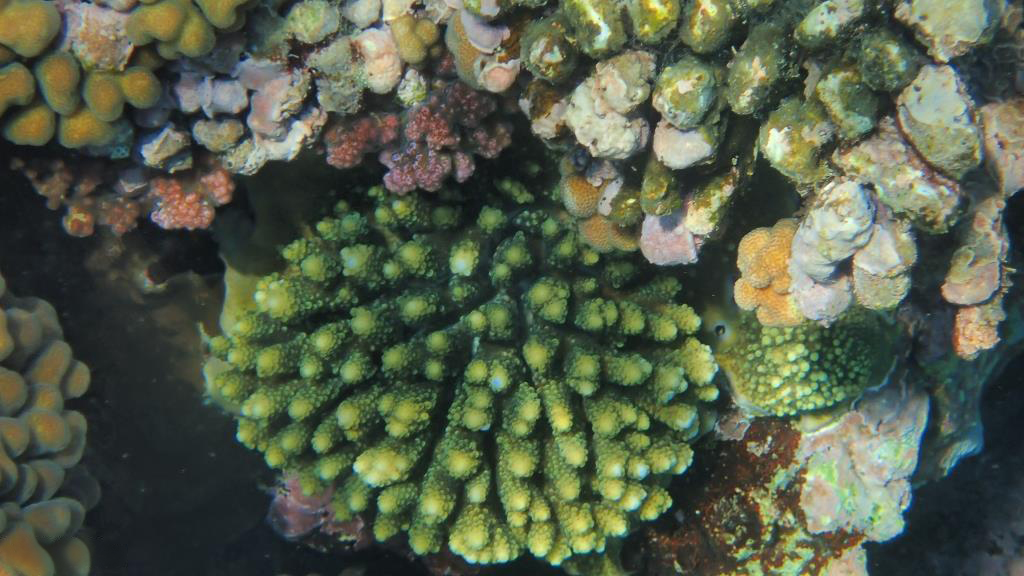
Coral in Nosy Ve-Androka National Park

Nosy Ve-Androka National Park is a Protected Marine Area located in the southwestern part of Madagascar, south of Tulear, and 40 km south of the tourist village of Anakao. It lies between latitudes 25 ° 29/25 ° 09 South and longitudes 44 ° 50/45 ° 06 East and covers an area of 92080 ha. It is composed of Core Areas totalling 28,820 ha and Buffer Zones totalling 63,260 ha. The park is made up of eight parcels in two clusters, with part found along the coast adjacent to Tsimanampetsotsa National Park. It includes sections of the rich coral reef system of South West Madagascar in the Mozambique Channel, recognized as the third largest reef system in the world. Diversity of habitats include fringing reefs, barrier reefs, coral reef beds, seagrass area, open sea, rocky coast and sandy beaches. The Nosy Ve-Androka National Park contains about 140 species of coral and 240 species of fish. There are also rare species such as Coelacanths, marine turtle species, dugongs, dolphins and whales and sandy beaches that are used by nesting sea turtles.

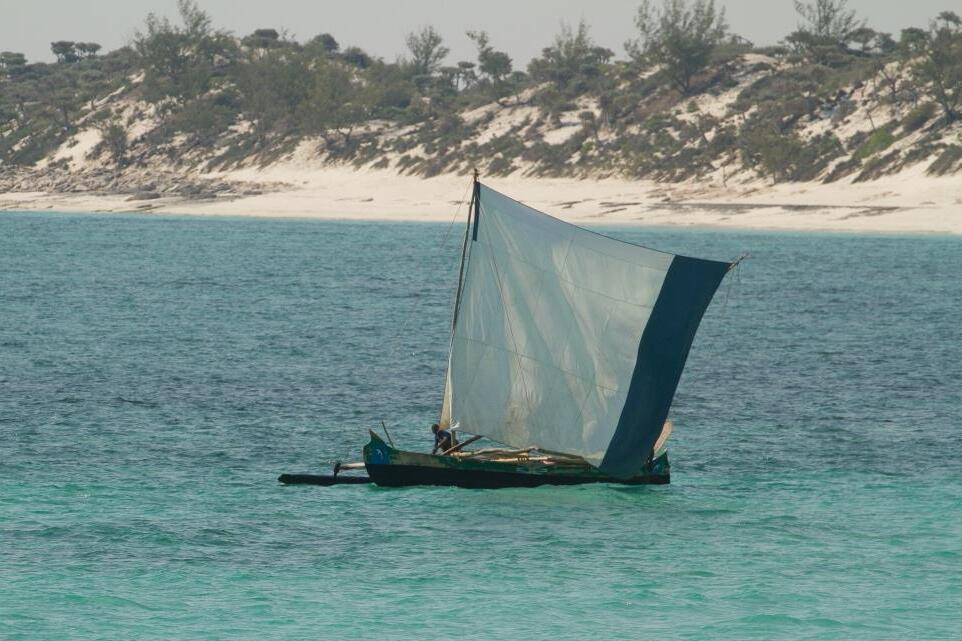
Fishing in outrigger canoe Nosy Ve-Androka National Park

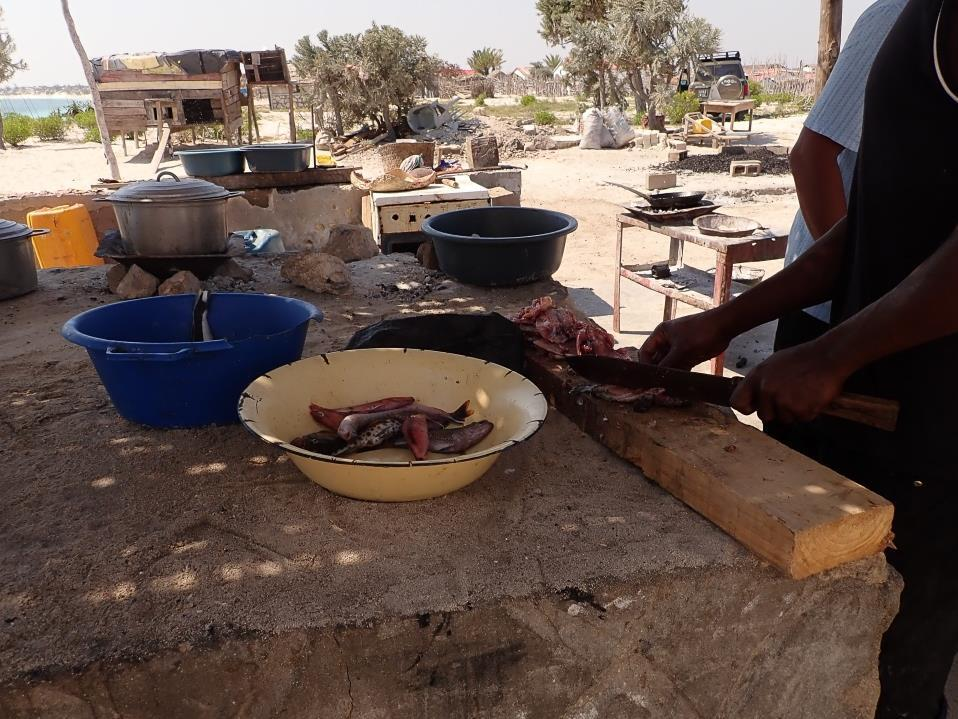
Reef fish are an important food source.

The park falls into three rural districts: Beheloke (Toliara II district), Itampolo and Androka (Ampanihy district). The local populations rely on the resources from the region's marine and coastal ecosystems, largely for subsistence fishing using outrigger canoes and foot fishing.

In July 2018, Tsimanampesotse – Nosy Ve Androka was established as Madagascar's 5th Biosphere Reserve. It belongs to the intertropical marine biogeographic system of the Southwest Indian Ocean and includes five large Malagasy ecoregions: the South Terrestrial Ecoregion, the Aquatic Ecoregion of the southern basins, the Aquatic Ecoregion of the West Basins, the Mozambique Mozambique Channel Marine Ecoregion and the South Marine Ecoregion. The core of the biosphere reserve is composed of the Tsimanampesotse National Park and the Nosy Ve - Androka Marine Park, managed by Madagascar National Parks; and Amoron'i Onilahy Category IV protected area, managed by local communities.
