= Nosy Tsarabanjina =

Island off the northwest coast of Madagascar

- Location within Madagascar

Geography
- Coordinates: 13°02′S 48°33′E
- Archipelago: Nosy Mitsio

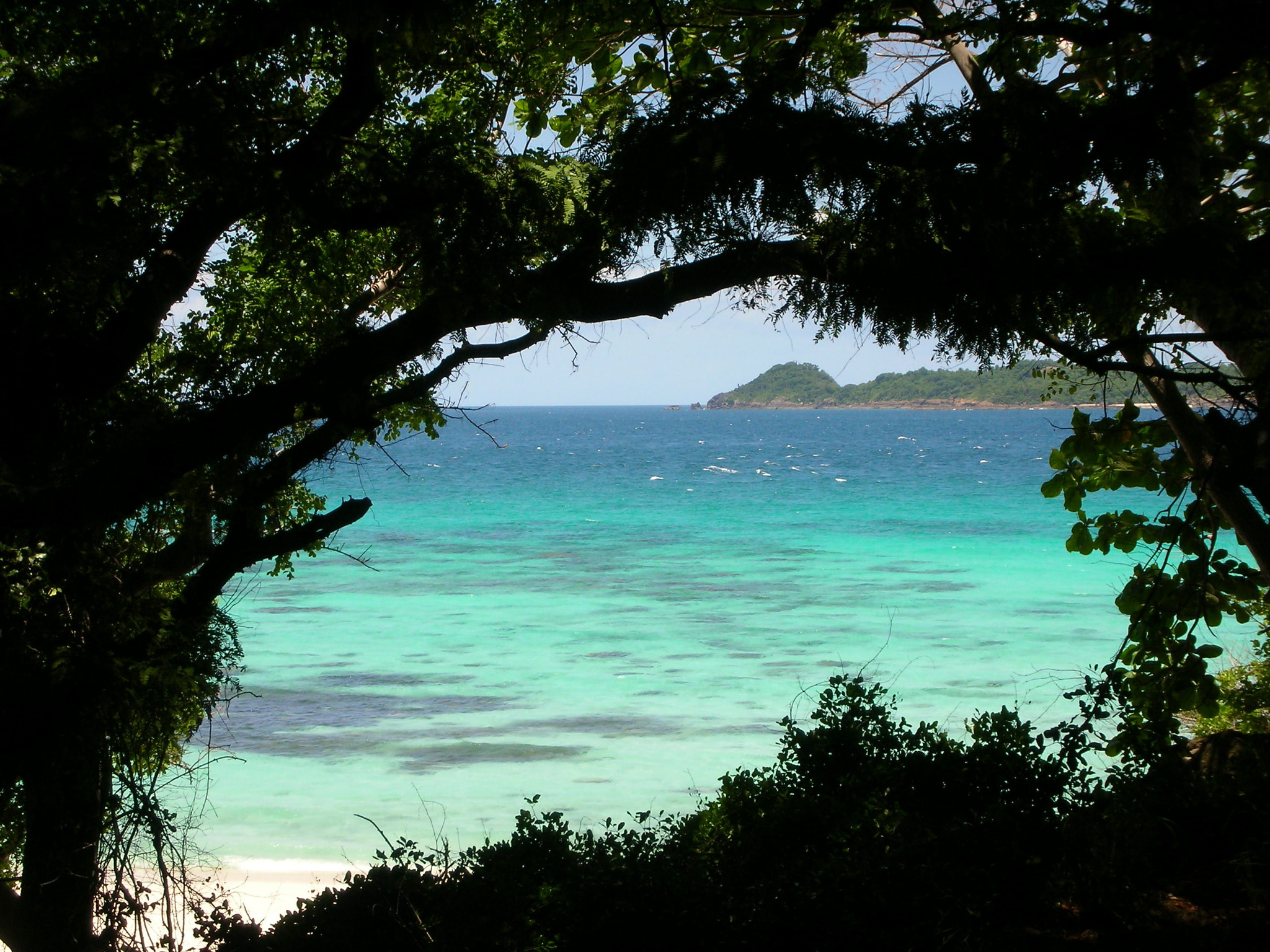
Nosy Tsarabanjina

Nosy Tsarabanjina is a small island off the northwest coast of Madagascar in the Mitsio archipelago, situated near Nosy Be and Nosy Mitsio.

It received a small amount of fame in 1994 when the BBC reality TV programme Girl Friday featured Joanna Lumley spending 10 days on the island and living firstly on an a-frame bed, and then in "the Albert Hall cave". Since the BBC programme, the Island has been taken over by a hotel.
