= Inglis Island =

Island in Northern Territory, Australia

Coordinates: 12°01′S 136°13′E

Inglis Island is the largest of a group called the English Company's Islands, in Northern Territory, Australia. It is 23.4 km long and up to 7 km wide. Its area is 83.5 km^{2}, and it reaches a height of 70 meters. The distance to the mainland south of it is 2.5 km at the closest place, across Nalwarung Strait, which is the southwestern continuation of Malay Road.

The only settlements are two small family outstations, Gonguruwuy in the west and Wurwula on the eastern tip of the island.
