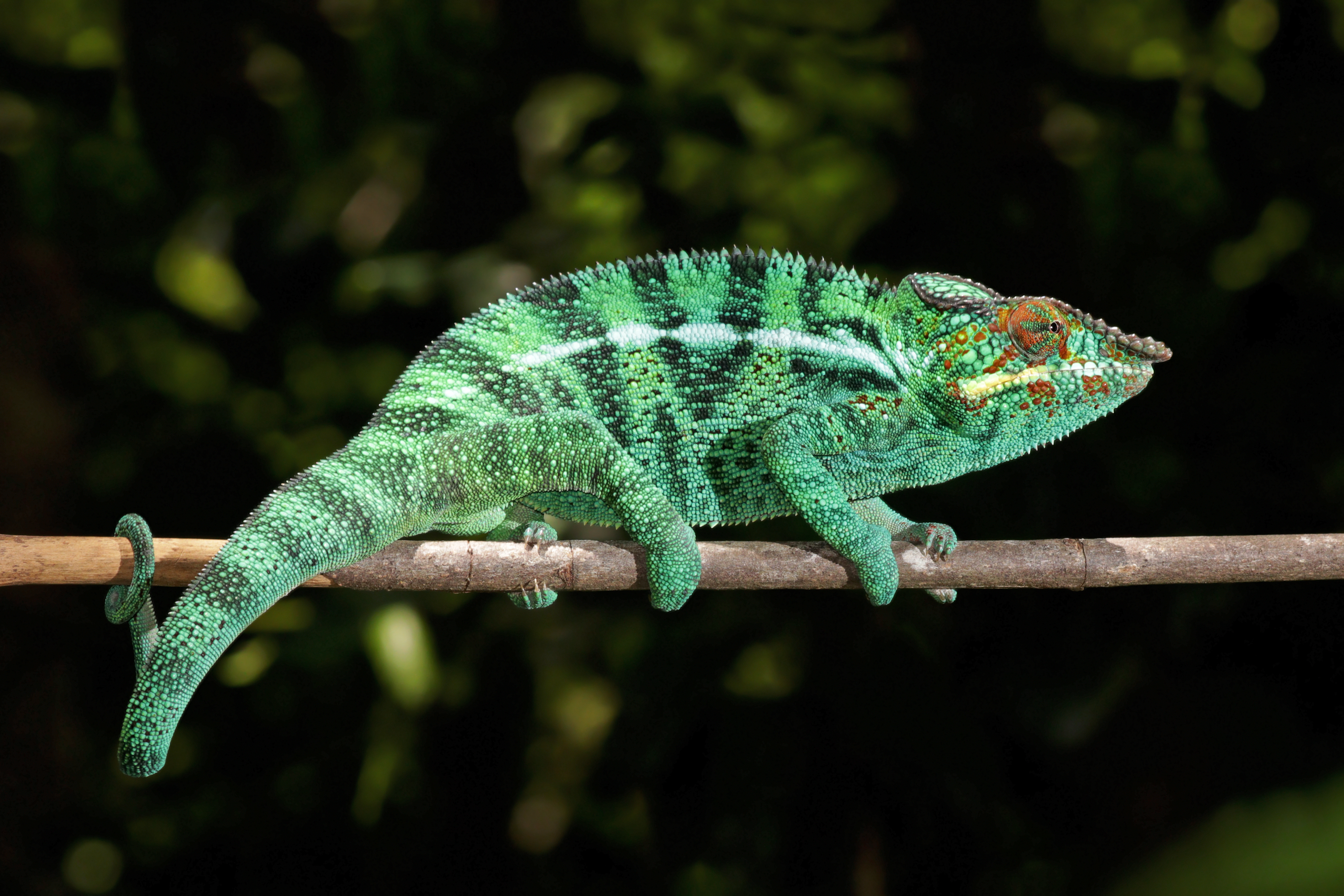
- Male
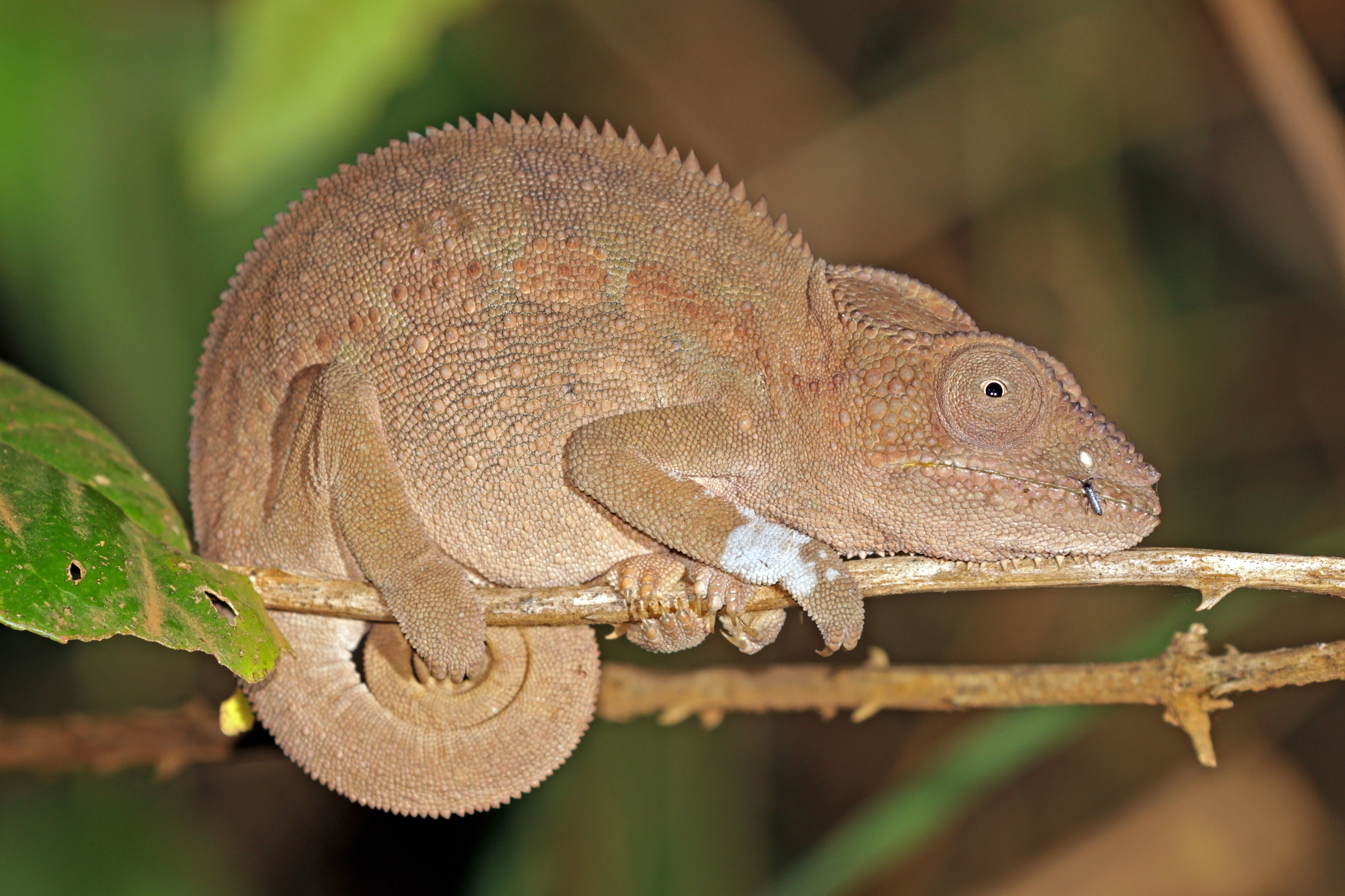
- Female

Conservation status
- Least Concern (IUCN 3.1)

Scientific classification
- Kingdom: Animalia
- Phylum: Chordata
- Class: Reptilia
- Order: Squamata
- Suborder: Iguania
- Family: Chamaeleonidae
- Genus: Furcifer
- Species: F. pardalis

Binomial name
- Furcifer pardalis (Cuvier, 1829)
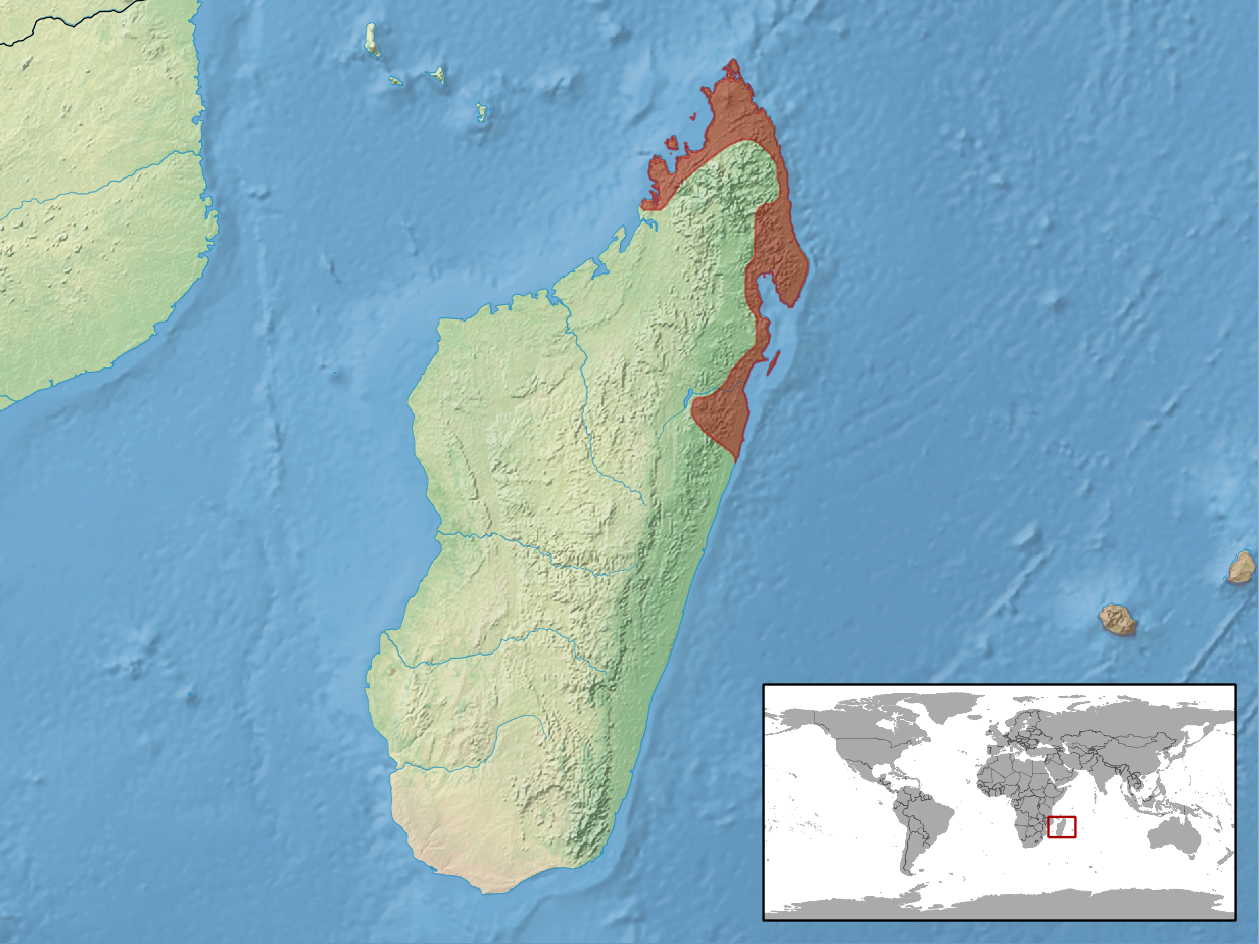

Synonyms
- Chamaeleo pardalis Cuvier 1829; Chamaeleo ater Lesson 1832; Cyneosaura pardalis Gray 1865; Chamaeleo guentheri Boulenger 1888; Chamaeleon longicauda Günther 1891; Chamaeleon axillaris Werner 1899; Chamaeleon krempfi Chabanaud 1923; Chamaeleo niger Duméril & Bibron 1836; Chamaeleon pardalis Werner 1911; Chamaeleon guentheri Werner 1911

= Panther chameleon =

Species of lizard

The panther chameleon (Furcifer pardalis) is a species of chameleon found in the eastern and northern parts of Madagascar in a tropical forest biome. Additionally, it has been introduced to Réunion and Mauritius, as well as the state of Florida within the United States.

Close-up video of a panther chameleon moving its eyes

== Taxonomy ==
The panther chameleon was first described by French naturalist Georges Cuvier in 1829. Its generic name (Furcifer) is derived from the Latin root furci meaning "forked" and refers to the shape of the animal's feet. The specific name pardalis refers to the animals' markings, as it is Latin for "leopard" or "spotted like a panther". The English word chameleon (also chamaeleon) derives from Latin chamaeleō, a borrowing of the Ancient Greek χαμαιλέων (khamailéōn), a compound of χαμαί (khamaí) "on the ground" and λέων (léōn) "lion". The Greek word is a calque translating the Akkadian nēš qaqqari, "ground lion".

Although currently regarded as a single widespread and variably-colored species, evidence from genetics and captive breeding indicates that it possibly should be split into several different species.

== Description ==
Panther chameleons grow 16-20" (40–51 cm) long, with females typically being smaller than males. In a form of sexual dimorphism, males are more vibrantly colored than the females. Another form of sexual dimorphism is in size, it has been concluded that males are much larger and heavier than females and therefore seen as a large sex difference in body size. Coloration varies with location, and the different color patterns of panther chameleons are commonly referred to as 'locales', which are named after the geographical location in which they are found. Panther chameleons from the areas of Nosy Be, Ankify, and Ambanja are typically a vibrant blue, and those from Ambilobe, Antsiranana, and Sambava are red, green or orange. The areas of Maroantsetra and Tamatave yield primarily red specimens. Numerous other color phases and patterns occur between and within regions. Females generally remain tan and brown with hints of pink, peach, or bright orange, no matter where they are found, but there are slight differences in patterns and colors among the different color phases.

Like all chameleons, panther chameleons exhibit a specialized arrangement of toes. On each foot, the five toes are fused into a group of two and a group of three; these specialized feet allow the panther chameleon a tight grip on narrow branches. Each toe is equipped with a sharp claw to gain traction on surfaces such as bark when climbing. On the forelimbs, there are two toes on the outer (distal) side of each foot and three on the inside (medial). On the hind legs, the arrangement is reversed: two toes are fused medially and three distally.

Panther chameleons have very long tongues (sometimes longer than their own body length) which they are capable of rapidly extending out of the mouth to capture prey, which is mostly terrestrial invertebrates and very rarely, plant material. Once the tip sticks to a prey item, it is drawn quickly back into the mouth, where the panther chameleon's strong jaws crush it and it is consumed.

== Distribution ==
=== Range ===
Panther chameleons are native to Madagascar; this species is widespread in lowland areas of the eastern and northeastern sections of the country. Additionally, it has been introduced to Réunion and Mauritius and recently within the US state of Florida through the pet trade.

=== Habitat ===
The panther chameleon lives in regions of rainforest in the east and drier broken forest/savannah in the northwest. The original primary plant communities within their range has been degraded by human activity; panther chameleons appear to thrive in degraded habitat and are frequently found near roads, homes, and in plantations.

== Behavior and ecology ==
The panther chameleon is very territorial; aside from mating, it spends the majority of its life in isolation. When two males come into contact, they will change color and inflate their bodies, attempting to assert their dominance. Often these battles end at this stage, with the loser retreating, turning drab and dark colors. Occasionally, the displays result in physical combat if neither contender backs down. Panther chameleons are facultative thermoregulators, and therefore when in need to be warmed they bask in sunlight or in captivity, lamp light. Panther chameleons have a large thermoneutral zone, meaning they have a temperature range within which they do not actively try to modify their body temperature; therefore, they can allow their body temperature to drift from 24–36 degrees Celsius during the daytime.

== Reproduction ==
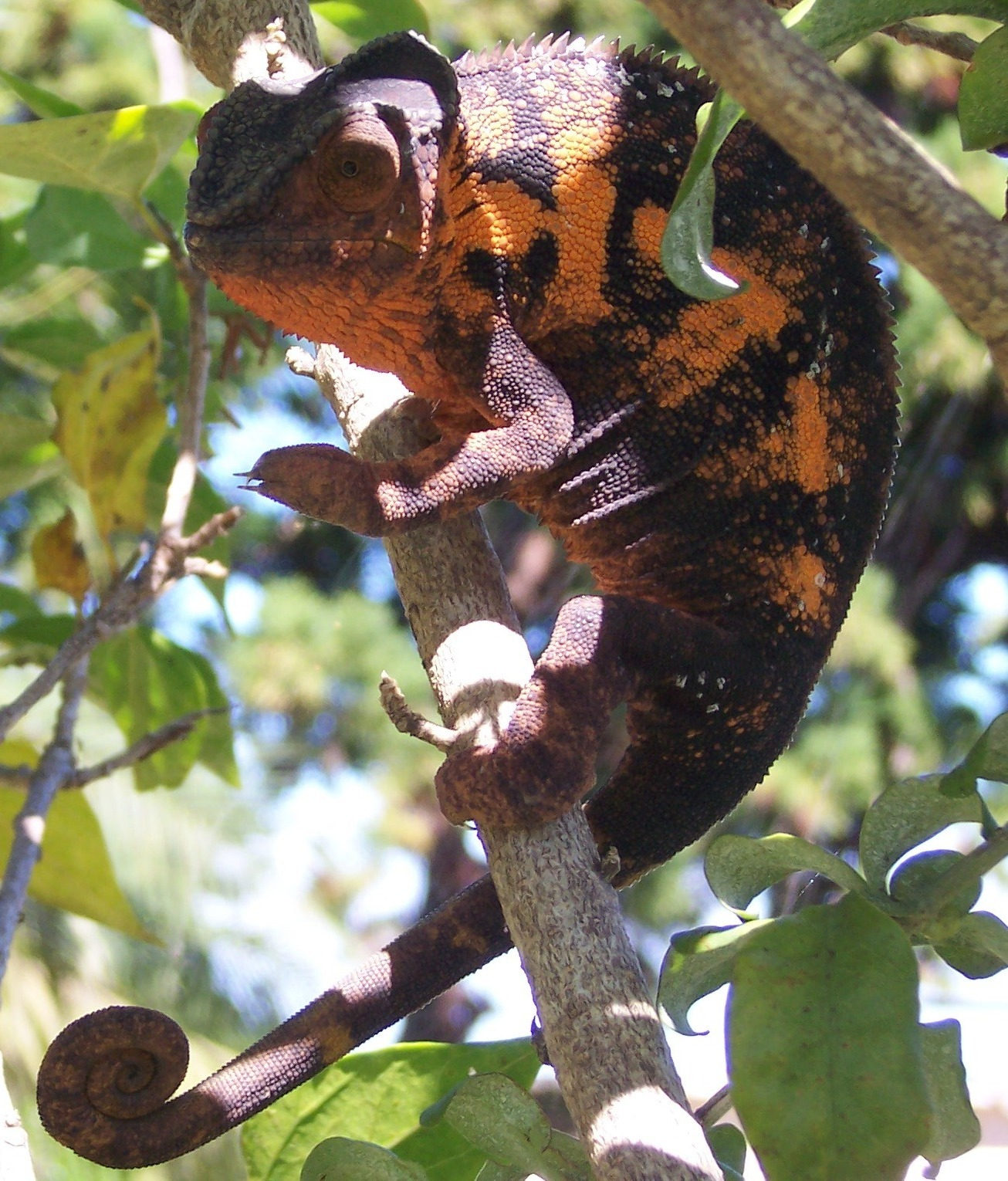
Gravid female, Réunion Island

Panther chameleons reach sexual maturity at a minimum age of seven months.

When gravid, or carrying eggs, females turn dark brown or black with orange striping to signify to males they have no intention of mating. Furthermore, females will become very defensive and may bite any advancing males. The exact coloration and pattern of gravid females varies depending on the color phase of the chameleon. This provides a way to distinguish between locales.

Females usually only live two to three years after laying eggs (between five and eight clutches) because of the stress put on their bodies. Females can lay between 10 and 40 eggs per clutch, depending on the food and nutrient consumption during the period of development. Eggs typically hatch in 240 days.

== In captivity ==
This species is highly sought after for the international pet trade due to its coloration, large size, and readiness to breed in captivity. Panther chameleons are occasionally kept as pets due to their striking coloration. While they are easier to care for than many other species of chameleon, panther chameleons are generally considered challenging to keep in captivity. Wild panther chameleons are a short lived species; few animals survive beyond a year of age in the wild. Captive animals may live longer than their wild counterparts; with good care females can live up to 3 years and males can live 5–7 years. It was found in a recent study that the amount of UVB available to the females in captivity affects their reproductive success. As such, the more UVB the higher her reproductive success.

== Gallery ==
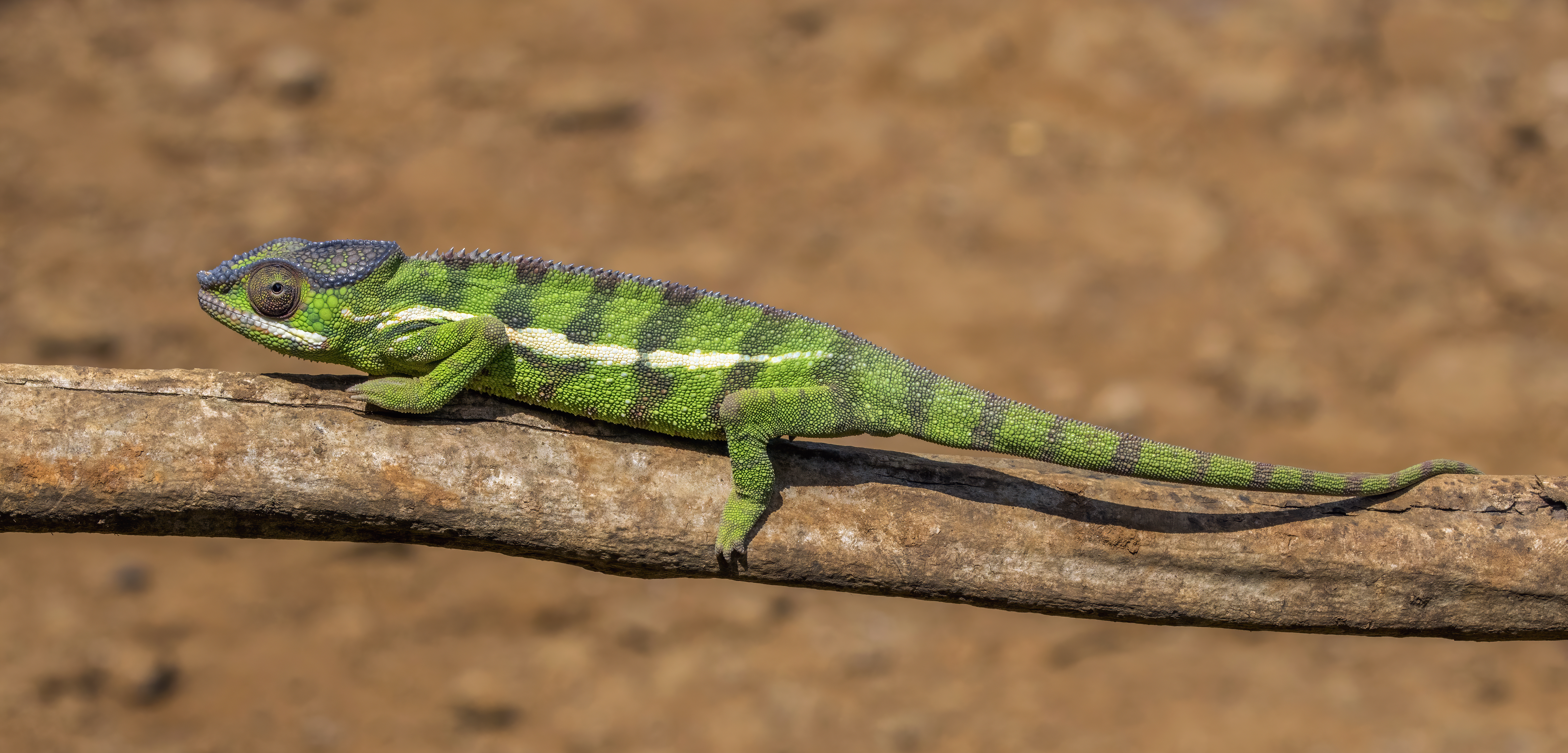
Male

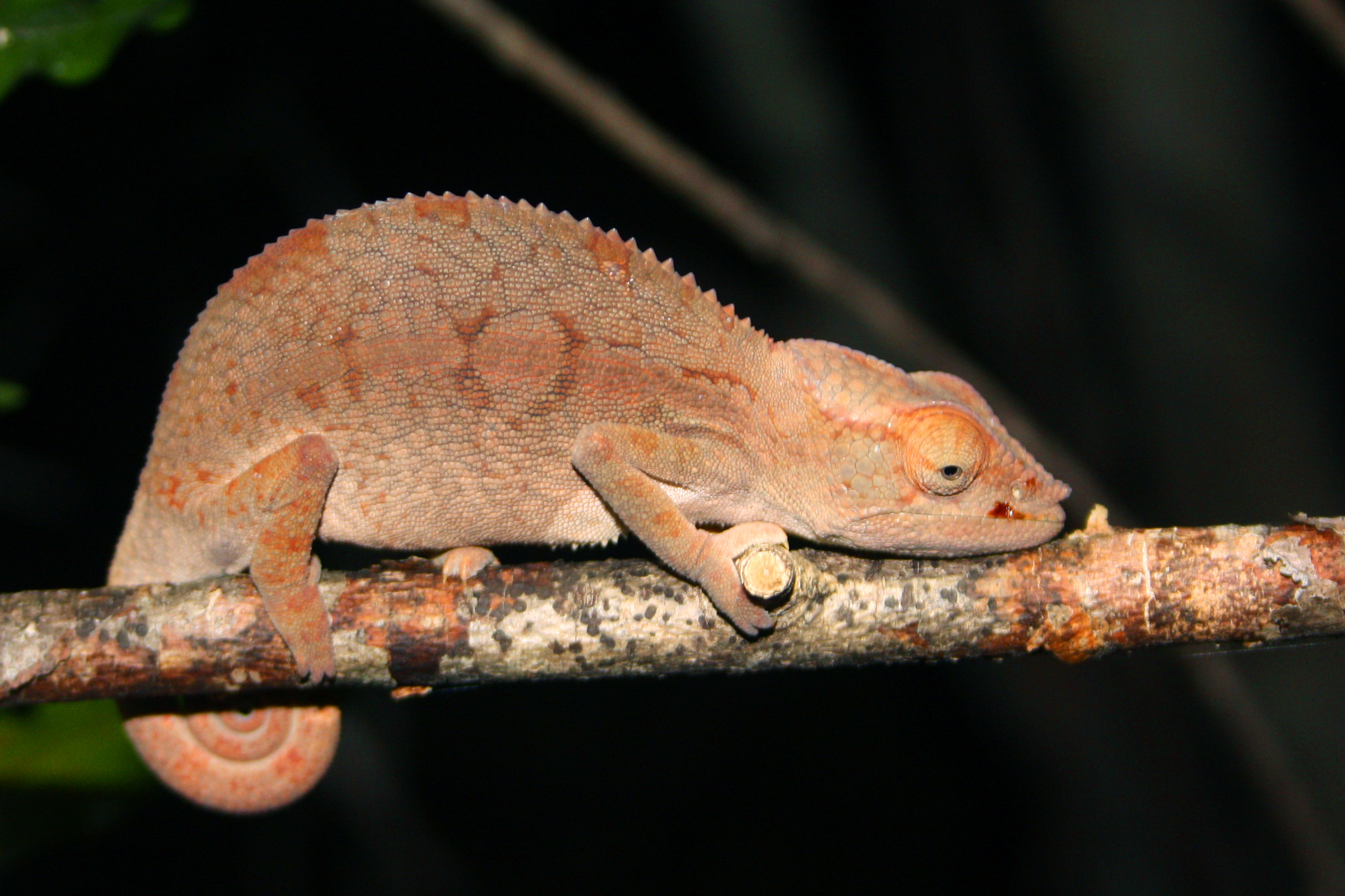
Female, Anjajavy Forest
