= Nosy Komba =

Island in Madagascar

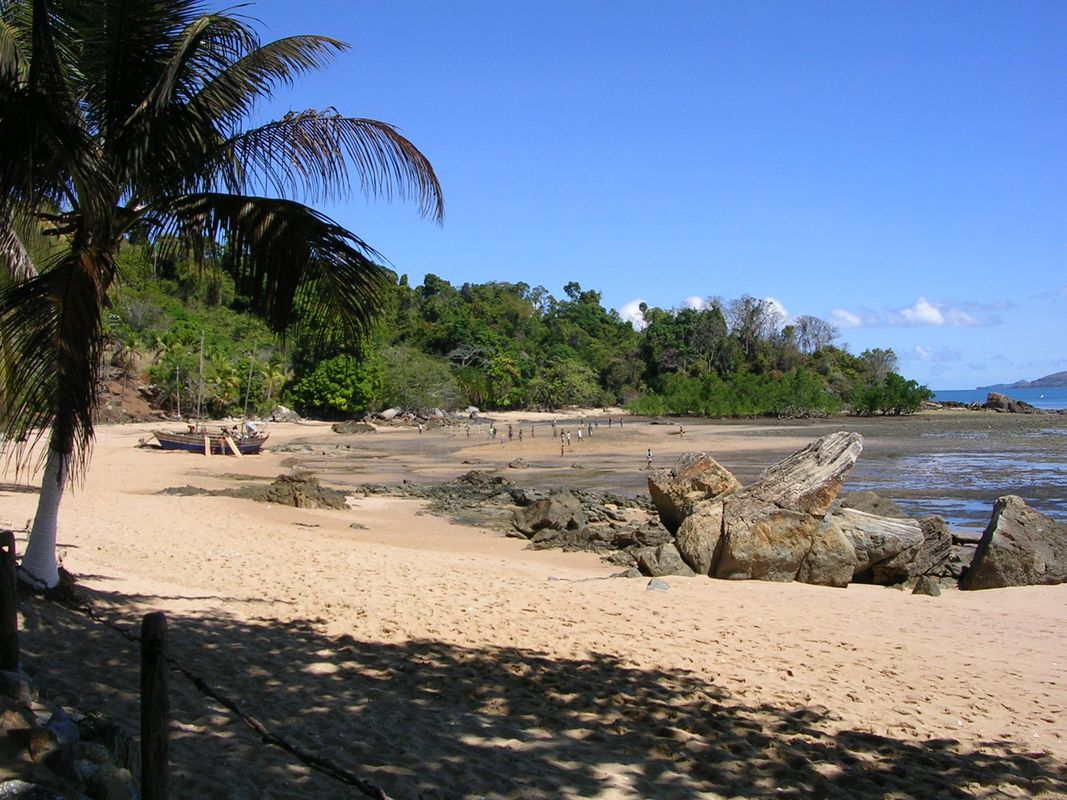
- Beach on Nosy Komba
- Interactive map of Nosy Komba

Geography
- Location: Madagascar
- Coordinates: 13.47°S 48.35°E
- Area: 27.9 km^{2} (10.8 sq mi)
- Highest elevation: 622 m (2041 ft)
- Highest point: Antaninaomby

Administration
- Madagascar
- Region: Diana Region
- District: Nosy-Be
- Commune: Nosy-Be
- Arrondissement: Ampangorina

Demographics
- Population: 5,834 (2018)
- Pop. density: 209/km^{2} (541/sq mi)

Nosy Komba (Malagasy pronunciation: [nusʲ ˈkuᵐba]; lit. 'island of lemurs'), also known as Nosy Ambariovato, is a small island in Madagascar, situated between the island of Nosy Be and the northwestern coast of the main island of Madagascar. Roughly circular, it rises sharply towards a plateau and the summit of Antaninaomby at the center of the island. Administered as an arrondissement of the unitary commune and district of Nosy-Be within Diana Region, the island is divided into five fokontany (villages), with Ampangorina as the main village and administrative center. The population is mainly restricted to the northern half of the island. The economy is reliant on tourism and handicrafts, supplemented by a wide range of agricultural products. Hotels and guest houses support tourists to the island, mainly on excursions from Nosy Be.

The lowlands of the island are divided between secondary forest and a patchwork of farmland and plantations (notably including shade-grown coffee), while the highlands are mainly scrubland, with a bamboo forest in the northern portions. The island hosts a diverse range of reptiles and amphibians, although this has been reduced by deforestation. The island is known for its black lemurs, causing it to attract significant ecotourism. Heavily deforested during the 19th and 20th centuries, the island has only small pockets of old-growth forest remaining in remote areas. Although the island hosts a traditionally protected forest and an arboretum established in the colonial era, protection for the latter is essentially unenforced, and illegal logging continues.

During the early 19th century, the region was heavily settled by Sakalava refugees and their slaves fleeing the hegemony of the Merina Kingdom. France gained control of the island in 1840; it was converted to a logistic center for the import of indentured servants and local slaves, and later a sanatorium retreat for colonists.

== Geography ==
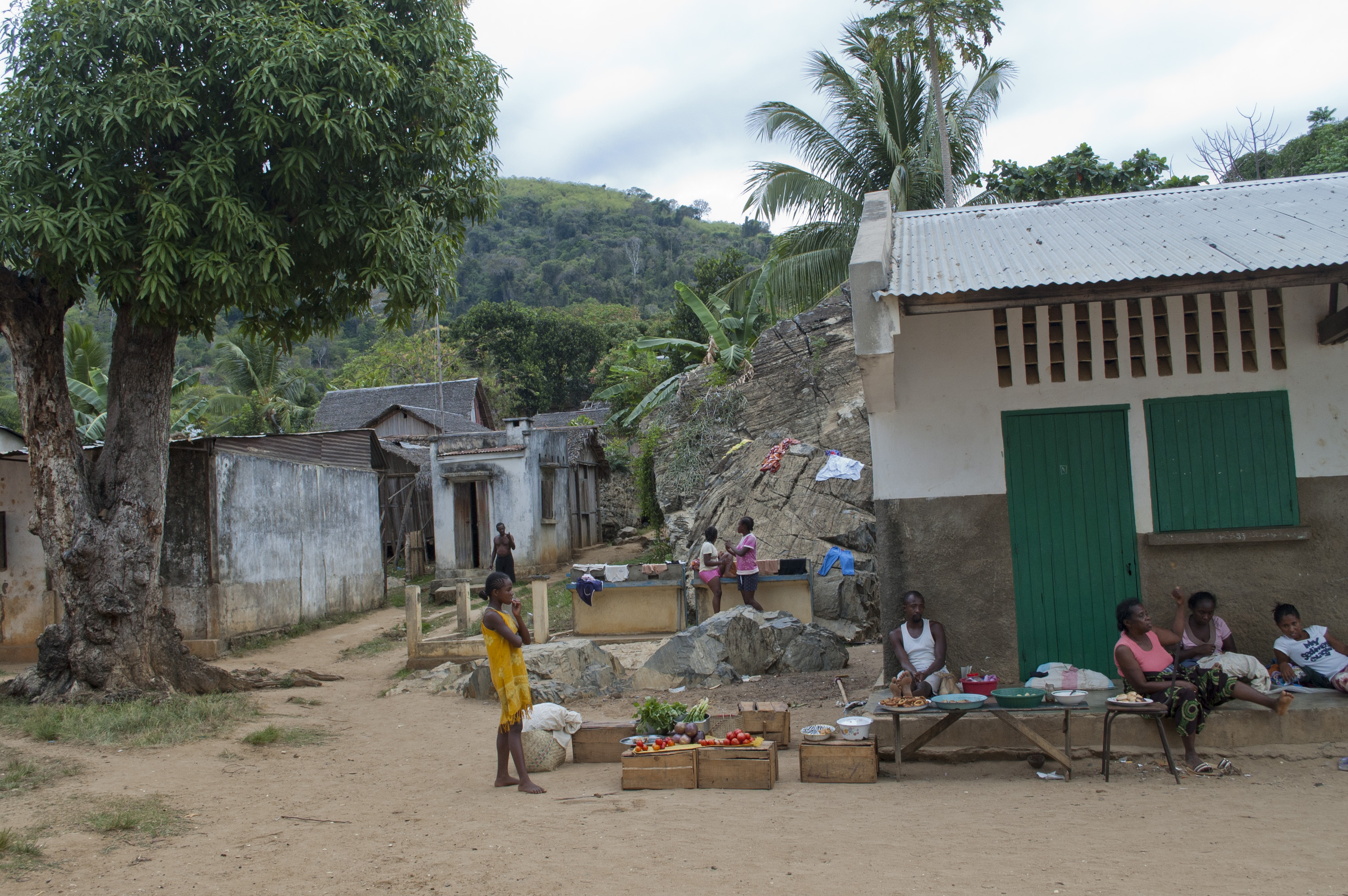
A village on Nosy Komba

Nosy Komba (from Malagasy, lit. 'island of lemurs'), also known as Nosy Ambariovato, is a small circular island 27.9 km^{2} (10.8 sq mi) in area. It is located 3 km (2 mi) south of the larger island of Nosy Be and 4 km (2.5 mi) north of Ankify, the nearest point of the main island of Madagascar. Nosy Komba's lowlands are largely divided between farmland and secondary forests, while scrub predominates in the highlands. All sides of the island steeply rise towards the central plateau. Antaninaomby, the summit of the island, reaches a height of 622 m (2,041 ft). Nearby is a slightly lower secondary summit, Ankisoabé.

The island has high precipitation for much of the year, but experiences a dry season from June to September. Weather data from nearby Nosy Be gives a mean annual temperature of around 26 °C (79 °F).

The island formed during or shortly after the end of the Cretaceous period 66 million years ago, as Madagascar separated from the continent of Africa. The landmass consists of an igneous intrusion of gabbro and nepheline surrounded by schist. One or more periods of magmatic activity emerged within the Nosy Be area during the Miocene, with Nosy Komba's igneous rock estimated at 10 million years old. During the Last Glacial Period, the island was connected to other nearby islands, including Nosy Be. Around 8,000 years ago, rising sea levels cut it off from the main island of Madagascar.

== History ==
In the early 19th century, the Merina Kingdom gained hegemony over the Sakalava-inhabited northwestern coast of Madagascar. Merina persecution motivated several revolts and the migration of 15,000 people, mainly Sakalava and their slaves, to Nosy Be and Nosy Komba. In 1837, Tsiomeko, the queen of Boina, fled to Nosy Komba. That year, Merina forces attempted to seize the island, but were repulsed.

Expanding French influence over the northwest coast of Madagascar forced Tsiomeko and the Merina to cede a portion of the coast to France in July 1840, including both islands. Three years later, the islands were placed under a local colonial administration named Nosy-Bé et Dépendances (lit. 'Nosy Be and Dependencies'). This was governed from the colony of Réunion. Nosy Be and Nosy Komba became centers for the colonial labor force, drawn from engagés (indentured servants) recruited from the mainland and local slaves. Engagés were often slaves whose freedom was purchased by Europeans, but who were then immediately engaged as indentured servants on 14-year contracts. Initially, the Malagasy were allowed to keep their slaves and rent them to settlers. However, slavery was abolished in the French colonies by an 1848 decree. This emancipation was welcomed by the French officials and settlers, who sought to increase the supply of labor, but it breached the earlier agreement with the Malagasy elites and led to slaveowners fleeing to Madagascar with their slaves and launching slave raids on Nosy Be. After the raids were repelled, the freedom of the remaining slaves was purchased. Since the emancipation decree did not apply to nearby islands and the main island of Madagascar, settlers continued to rent slaves from Malagasy elites, shipping them as engagés (alongside others recruited in mainland East Africa) to Mayotte and Réunion. A large hangar housing over 800 workers was constructed on Nosy Komba by the late 1850s and was used to screen newly recruited laborers from Mozambique; many died soon after reaching the island.

French settler-colonial efforts on Nosy Be were persistently hampered by outbreaks of diseases such as malaria, cholera, and smallpox. To remedy this, a convalescence for French settlers was built on the adjacent Nosy Komba in 1841, immediately following the French annexation of the region, with an upgraded facility constructed in 1876. The location of the retreat on Nosy Komba's highlands was motivated by 19th-century beliefs in the healing effects of high-altitude environments, alongside the existence of ample colonial labor to support the European settlers. Native laborers were used to carry European patients up to the mountain from the lowlands.

In 1895, this retreat was further upgraded into a full sanatorium following widespread malaria outbreaks among French colonial troops during the Second Madagascar expedition. Functioning as a sorting station for a variety of other medical facilities in northern Madagascar, it could house 500 patients at any one time. A total of 1,883 patients passed through the facility over the course of 1895, with a mortality rate of 5.3%, much lower than the rate for colonial troops on the main island of Madagascar. Despite this, conditions were poor enough for resident physician Jean Darricarrère to label it a "sanatorium in name only". The island remained in limited use as a sanatorium, with ill colonists using it as a refuge from Nosy Be as late as 1928. The local administration of Nosy Be was integrated into French Madagascar in 1957, which gained full independence as the Malagasy Republic in 1960.

== Flora and fauna ==
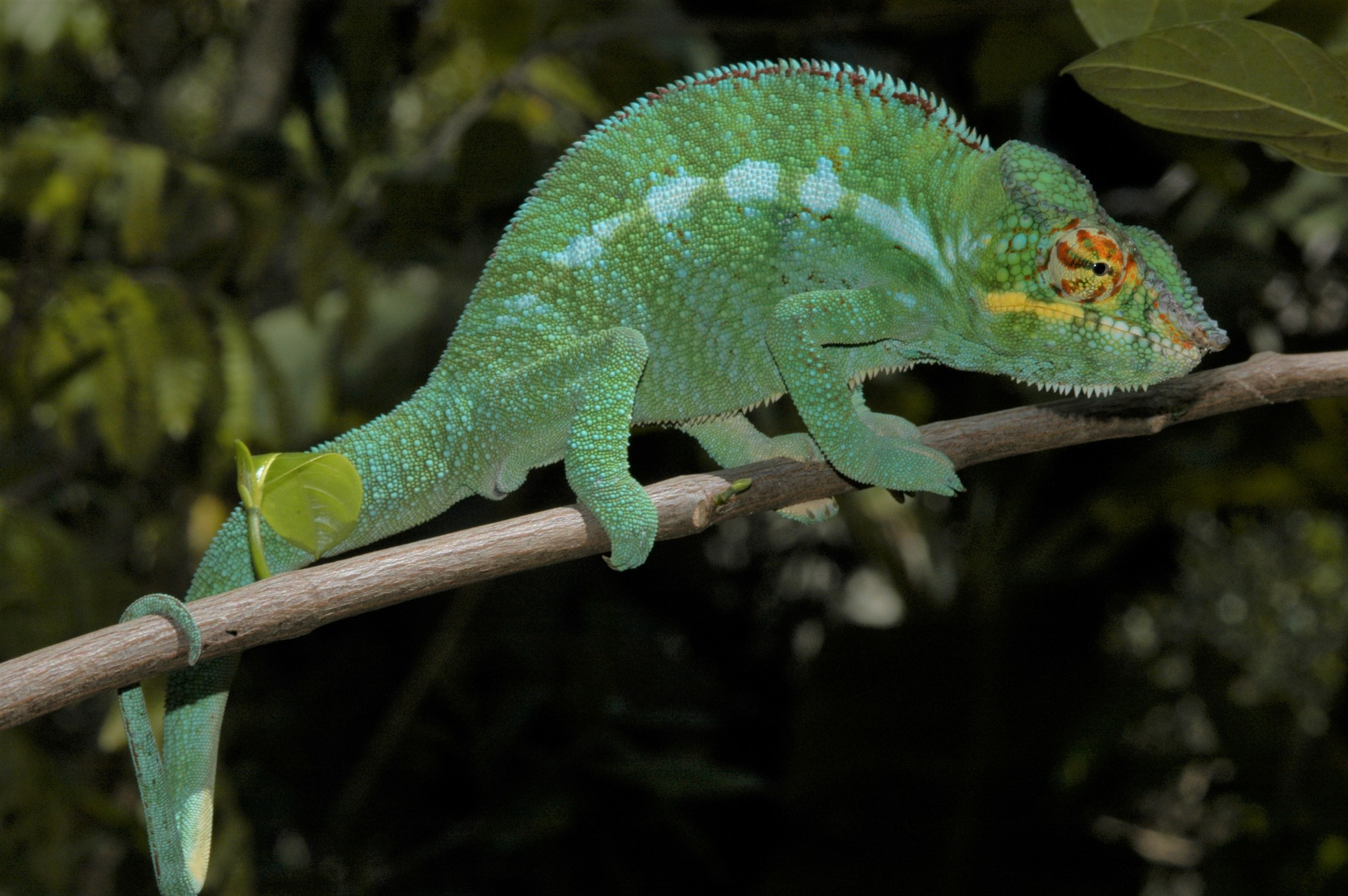
A panther chameleon on Nosy Komba

Alongside much of northwestern Madagascar, Nosy Komba is located within the Sambirano rainforest phytogeographical region. The heavy dry season characteristic of the region has led to the emergence of sclerophyllous plants (tolerant of dry heat). Like the rest of Sambriano, Nosy Komba hosts a population of the flowering plant Takhtajania perrieri, the only species of the family Winteraceae in Africa. In 1998, a research team discovered a species of liverwort endemic to the summit of the island, dubbed Cololejeunea nosykombae.

The secondary forests covering much of the island are composed largely of Fabaceae trees and non-native fruit trees such as mango and jackfruit. Larger indigenous trees are only prevalent in small areas of the island. The highland scrub on the northern sides of the island is dominated chiefly by a presumably introduced bamboo forest.

Nosy Komba hosts 41 known species of reptiles. These include six species of chameleon, six species of skink, two plated lizards, 16 species of gecko, and 11 species of snakes. The island is also home to eleven species of frogs; these are the only known amphibians on the island. Although highly diverse for an island of its size, the level of diversity on Nosy Komba is significantly lower than the adjacent Nosy Be, which hosts twice as many frog species. Widespread deforestation over the 19th and 20th centuries likely contributed to this disparity; while both islands were almost entirely deforested, the Lokobe National Park on Nosy Be allowed for a great diversity of reptile and amphibian species to persist on the larger island. Some forest-dependent species of reptiles may have only survived on Nosy Komba in small pockets of the remaining forests along steep hills and valleys.

=== Lemurs ===
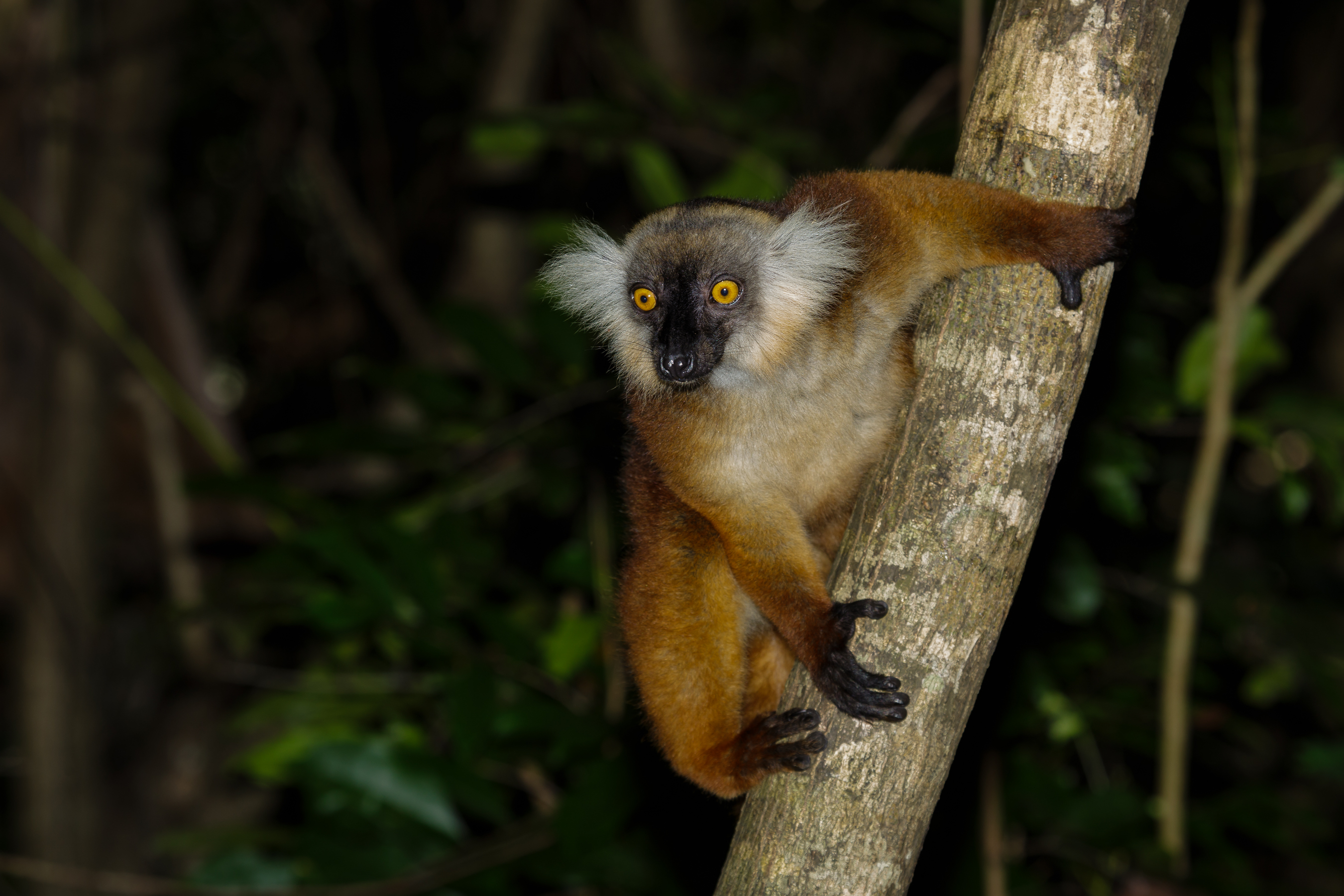
A black lemur on Nosy Komba

The island hosts a population of black lemurs; these are protected by residents. Unlike in some other areas within the lemurs' range in northeastern Madagascar, they are not regarded as sacred animals by locals. The Nosy Komba population of black lemurs was found to have a lower genetic diversity than the population on Nosy Be, and likely came from a population on the Ambato peninsula of the main island.

At least one species of nocturnal sportive lemur, the gray-backed sportive lemur, previously inhabited the island. No confirmed sightings have been made since the late 1990s. A 2013 survey could not find any direct evidence of nocturnal lemurs on Nosy Komba. Some inhabitants of rural areas of the island testified to the continued existence of a nocturnal lemur colony near the summit of the island, and attribute the population decline to wildfires, deforestation, and the locally taboo practice of hunting the animals for bushmeat.

=== Conservation ===
No environmental restrictions on development are enforced on the island, nor are there any permanent research stations or environmental monitors. Nosy Komba hosts a traditionally protected area of around 45 ha (110 acres) of old-growth indigenous forest. During the colonial era, a 60 ha (150 acres) arboretum was established in the highlands. Officially under the Ministry of the Environment and Forests, there is essentially no enforcement of environmental protection measures in the area, and it has been heavily damaged by continued logging in addition to natural damage incurred over time from tropical storms. Due to the island's small size, human activity alongside natural disasters such as severe storms have had an intensified impact on local species. This impact is not always negative: The patchwork of shade-grown coffee plantations and adjacent forests has functioned as a refuge for many species of reptiles on the island, and the chameleon Calumma boettgeri has experienced considerable population growth over recent decades, due to factors including a lack of predators and its adaptability to degraded habitats. Nosy Komba is adjacent to the Tanikely Marine Reserve, the oldest marine reserve in Madagascar.

== Demographics and administration ==
Most of Nosy Komba's population is located on the northern half of the island, with the south very sparsely populated. Ampangorina is the main village, and the center of the Ampangorina arrondissement which encompasses the island. Part of the unitary commune and district of Nosy Be, it is divided between five fokontany (villages)—Ampangoriana, Antitorona, Antamotamo, Ampasibe, and Anjiabe. The 2018 census reported a total population of 5,834, all classified as rural. Out of these, 2,939 were females and 2,895 were males. There were 1,706 households, resulting in an average household size of 3.4.

== Economy ==
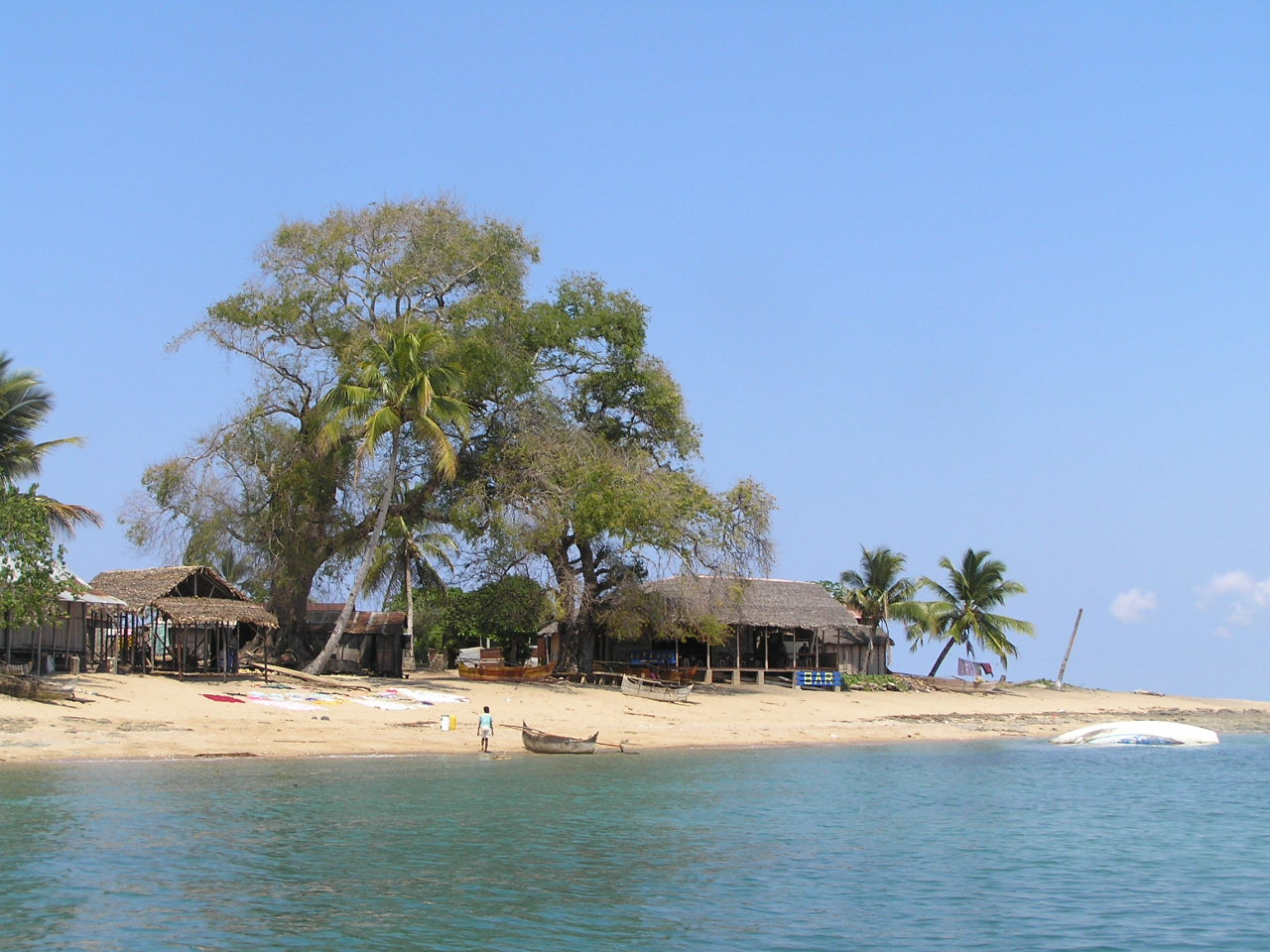
Beachside houses on Nosy Komba

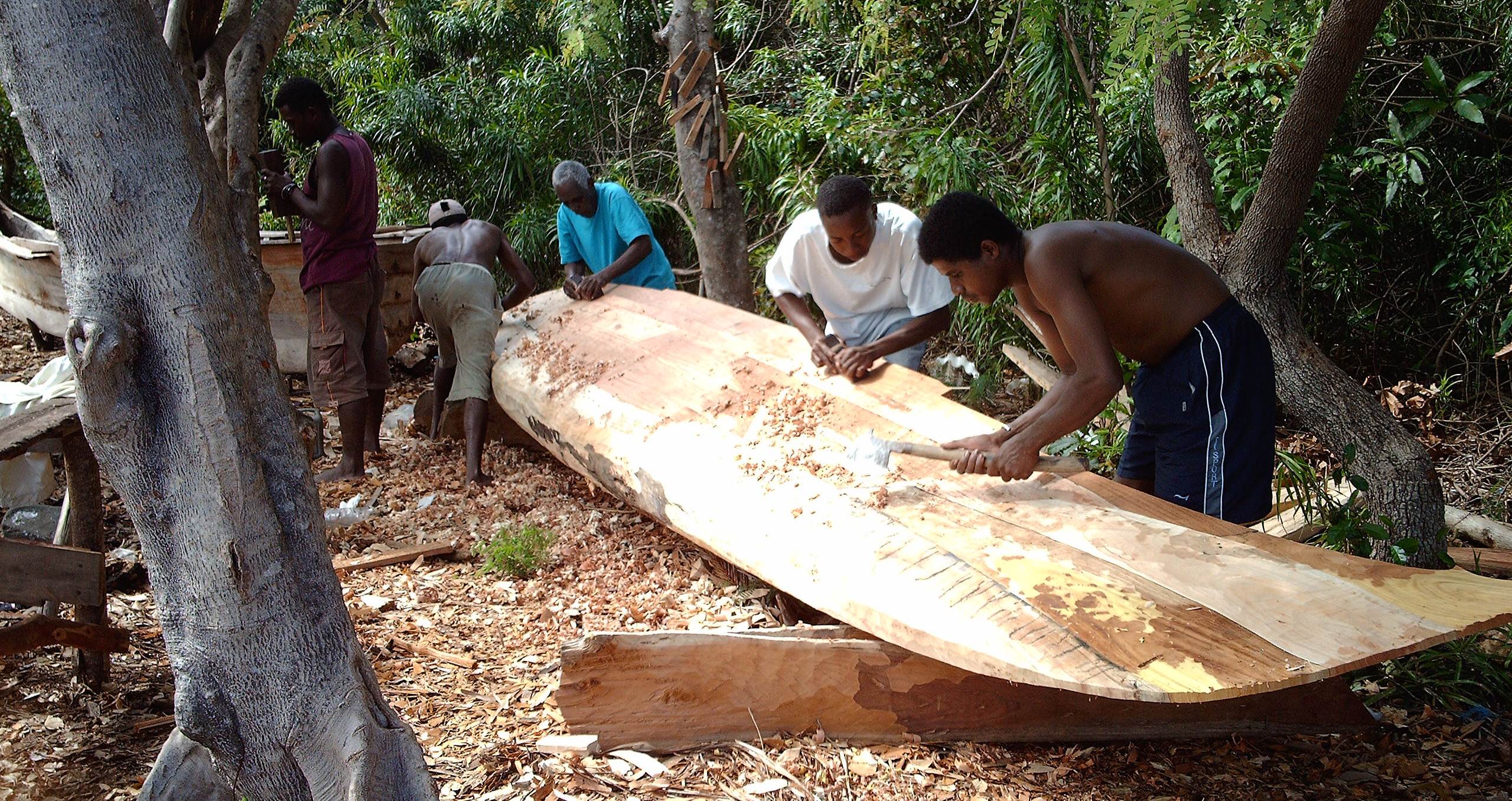
Men building a boat on the island

Tourism and the production of handicrafts are the main economic activities on the island. A wide variety of crops are grown on the island. Shade-grown coffee and cacao are grown in designated plantations, while other plantations grow crops such as cassava, chili, banana, pineapple, rice, sugar cane, teak, vanilla, and black pepper.

=== Tourism ===
Like Nosy Be and many other small islands off the coast of Madagascar, Nosy Komba hosts a large number of hotels and tourist facilities, mainly catering to ecotourism. The largest on the island, Tsara Komba Lodge, consists of eight bungalows. The hotels are supplemented by around 13 guest houses, which are privately rented out to tourists. Many of these facilities are designed to accommodate one-day stays for excursions from Nosy Be. Cruise ships and pirogues connect Nosy Komba with Nosy Be. Tourist infrastructure is limited to the coastal lowlands; no such infrastructure exists at higher altitudes.
