= Ankify =

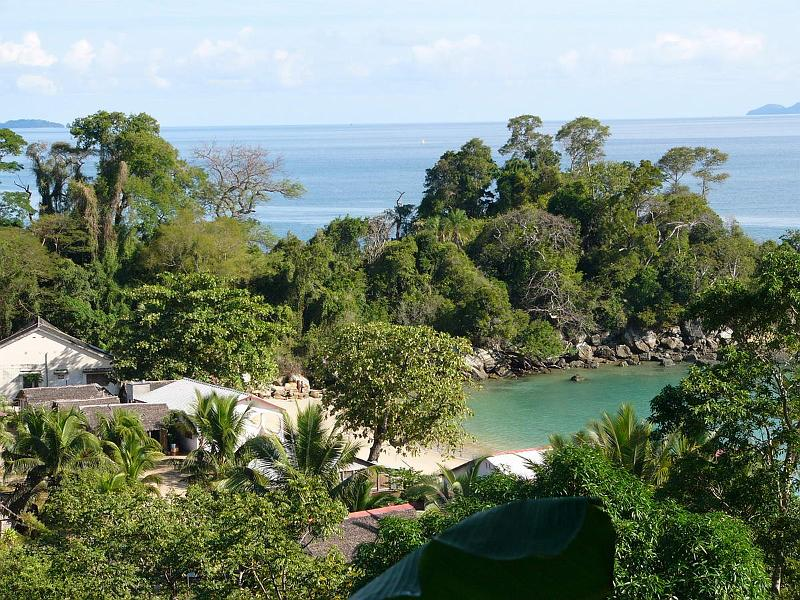

- Location in Madagascar
- Coordinates: 13°32′10″S 48°21′15″E
- Country: Madagascar
- Province: Antsiranana
- Region: Diana
- District: Ambanja
- Time zone: UTC3 (EAT)

Ankify is a peninsula located in the region of Diana in northern Madagascar. It is located at 13°32′10″S 48°21′15″E and faces the Nosy Be and Nosy Komba islands. A small harbor allows boardings to these destinations. The village of Doany is located at its northernmost point, which is bordered by a small coral reef.
