= Nosy Berafia =

Island off the north west coast of Madagascar

- Location within Madagascar

Geography
- Coordinates: 14°1′S 47°48′E
- Archipelago: Radama Archipelago

Nosy Berafia is an island off the north west coast of Madagascar. It is the largest island in the Radama Archipelago. It is around 10 km long and 3 km wide. Its chief town is Antananabe, which houses the Mahabo royal tombs. Most people on the island are fishermen. There are also many coffee, mango, and jackfruit plantations on the island.
