= Madagascar National Parks =

The logo of Madagascar National Parks, showing the ring-tailed lemur

The former logo used when the organization was known as ANGAP

Madagascar National Parks, formerly known as the Association Nationale pour la Gestion des Aires Protégées (ANGAP; lit. 'National Association for the Management of Protected Areas'), founded in 1990, manages 46 National Parks, Special Reserves and Integral Nature Reserves in Madagascar. Although a private association, since 4 December 1991, it is legally recognised to have a public function and operates under the supervision of the Ministry of the Environment and Forests (MEF).

The association's mission statetement is "To establish, conserve and sustainably manage a national network of parks and reserves representative of the biological diversity and the natural heritage of Madagascar."

== See also ==
- Protected areas of Madagascar
