= Nosy Be =

Island in Madagascar

- Nosy Be is situated off the west coast of Diana Region in northern Madagascar.

Geography
- Location: Mozambique Channel
- Coordinates: 13°18′54″S 48°16′03″E
- Area: 320.02 km^{2} (123.56 sq mi)
- Highest elevation: 450 m (1480 ft)
- Highest point: Mont Lokobe

Administration
- Madagascar
- Region: Diana Region

Demographics
- Population: 109,465 (2018)

Nosy Be (Malagasy pronunciation: [nusʲ be]; formerly Nossi-bé and Nosse Be, lit. 'big island') is a volcanic island off the northwest coast of Madagascar. Nosy Be is Madagascar's largest and busiest tourist destination. It has an area of 320.02 km^{2} (123.56 sq mi), and its population was 109,465 according to the provisional results of the 2018 Census.

Nosy Be means "big island" in the Malagasy language. The island was called Assada by the French during the early 17th century. Nosy Be has been given several nicknames over the centuries, including "Nosy Manitra" (the scented island).

== History ==
The first human inhabitants of Nosy Be were small bands from Antankarana and Zafinofotsy ethnic groups, before the Sakalava people migrated there and became the largest group on the island. These people were joined later by some Comorians, Indians and Antandroy. Nosy Be made its first major appearance in Madagascar's history when King Radama I announced that he intended to conquer the whole west of Madagascar. That plan was eventually achieved in 1837 when the Sakalava Kingdom of Boina came into the possession of Ranavalona I upon the defeat of Queen Tsiomeko's army.

The French colonized the island from 1840, founding an outpost named Hell-Ville (from French Admiral de Hell). The 1848 abolition of slavery in the French colonies resulted in a revolt against the French by the Sakalava people, who were extensively involved in the slave trade. In the late 19th and early 20th centuries, the island was governed by the French as an internal protectorate within the colony of Madagascar. The outpost became an important trade harbor in the Mozambique channel.

During the nineteenth century, the French settlers developed cash crop agriculture (mainly sugar cane) and recruited indentured laborers from East Africa. Though it was difficult for the French to control the littoral, they founded a plantation colony in Nosy Be, mainly producing sugar and cash crops. The French used both military force and diplomacy to maintain their position in the island, appointing the former ruler of Nosy Be Binao as the gouverneur principal of the island.

During the Russo-Japanese War Nosy Be became a supply station for Russia's Second Pacific Squadron. The main fleet led by Admiral Zinovy Rozhestvensky reached Nosy Be on January 9, 1905, where it met a smaller detachment led by Admiral Dmitry von Fölkersam that had arrived already on December 28, 1904. The fleet stayed for two months for refurbishing and coaling, leaving on March 17 to meet its fate ten weeks later at the Battle of Tsushima.

In 2013, two French tourists and one local were lynched (beaten and burned by a mob) after rumors that they were responsible for the death of a local boy. A Madagascar court gave four men the maximum hard labour for life over the mob lynching.

== Geography ==
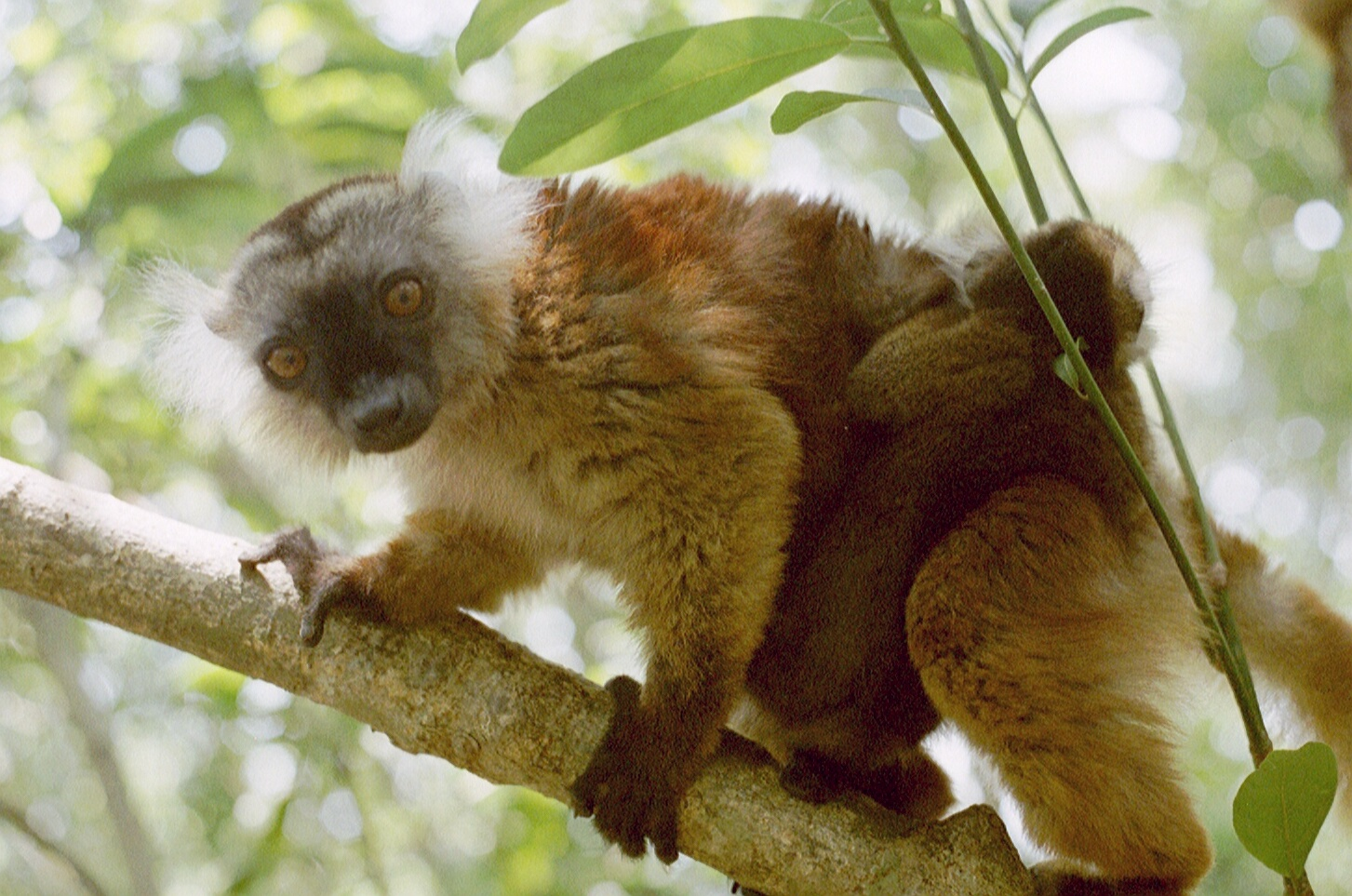
A female black lemur and her offspring at the Lokobe Reserve, Nosy Be, November, 2001

Nosy Be is located about 8 kilometres (5.0 mi) from the coast of Madagascar in the Mozambique Channel; several smaller islands are located nearby, including Nosy Komba, Nosy Mitsio, Nosy Sakatia, and Nosy Tanikely. The island's main town is Andoany, commonly known as Hell-Ville.

The volcanic island has an area of about 312 km^{2} (120 sq mi) – 30 km long, 19 km wide – and its highest peak is Mont Lokobe at 450 m (1,480 ft); the volcano is of Pleistocene origin and has not erupted in recent history. There are eleven volcanic crater lakes on the island.

=== Climate ===
Nosy Be has a tropical savanna climate. It is most humid in summer (December, January, February). The Tsaratanana massif partially protects the island from the strong north-east winds affecting the region in August or during tropical depressions. The wet season lasts from October until the beginning of May, followed by a relatively short dry season that lasts through September. As characteristic of its climate however, it still sees moderate amounts of precipitation even during this time. Daytime temperatures remain fairly steady throughout the year, hovering around 30 °C (86 °F), while the nights are slightly cooler during the dry season.

Climate data for Nosy Be (1991–2020)
Month	Jan	Feb	Mar	Apr	May	Jun	Jul	Aug	Sep	Oct	Nov	Dec	Year
Record high °C (°F)	35.0 (95.0)	35.0 (95.0)	36.8 (98.2)	35.4 (95.7)	36.0 (96.8)	34.2 (93.6)	34.5 (94.1)	35.4 (95.7)	34.4 (93.9)	36.3 (97.3)	37.0 (98.6)	36.0 (96.8)	37.0 (98.6)
Mean daily maximum °C (°F)	31.5 (88.7)	31.5 (88.7)	31.9 (89.4)	32.2 (90.0)	31.4 (88.5)	30.2 (86.4)	29.7 (85.5)	30.0 (86.0)	30.6 (87.1)	31.8 (89.2)	31.9 (89.4)	31.6 (88.9)	31.2 (88.2)
Daily mean °C (°F)	27.7 (81.9)	27.7 (81.9)	28.0 (82.4)	28.0 (82.4)	26.8 (80.2)	25.4 (77.7)	24.6 (76.3)	24.8 (76.6)	25.6 (78.1)	27.1 (80.8)	27.7 (81.9)	27.8 (82.0)	26.8 (80.2)
Mean daily minimum °C (°F)	23.9 (75.0)	24.0 (75.2)	24.1 (75.4)	23.7 (74.7)	22.3 (72.1)	20.6 (69.1)	19.5 (67.1)	19.5 (67.1)	20.5 (68.9)	22.3 (72.1)	23.4 (74.1)	23.9 (75.0)	22.3 (72.1)
Record low °C (°F)	20.2 (68.4)	20.4 (68.7)	21.4 (70.5)	19.0 (66.2)	15.0 (59.0)	13.0 (55.4)	12.7 (54.9)	13.7 (56.7)	13.0 (55.4)	16.0 (60.8)	17.6 (63.7)	20.2 (68.4)	12.7 (54.9)
Average precipitation mm (inches)	392.9 (15.47)	334.3 (13.16)	280.9 (11.06)	106.2 (4.18)	34.8 (1.37)	29.3 (1.15)	21.2 (0.83)	26.7 (1.05)	35.0 (1.38)	29.8 (1.17)	135.0 (5.31)	302.1 (11.89)	1,728.2 (68.04)
Average precipitation days (≥ 1 mm)	19.5	17.3	16.5	9.3	4.7	4.5	3.4	3.6	4.2	4.0	9.8	15.8	112.6
Mean monthly sunshine hours	187.0	171.2	224.0	245.0	271.3	248.9	263.7	284.9	277.6	281.1	249.1	219.7	2,923.5
Source: NOAA (sun, 1961–1990)

== Flora and fauna ==
The island is known for having populations of the world's smallest frogs (Stumpffia pygmaea) and chameleon (Brookesia minima). The Lokobe Reserve is one of Madagascar's five Strict Nature Reserves (Réserves Naturelles Intégrales). Nosy Be is also home to a specific color of panther chameleon (Furcifer pardalis).

Nocturnal animals include lemurs (mouse and dwarf), chameleons (e.g. short nosed, and stump tailed), leaf-tailed geckos, frogs, and birds.

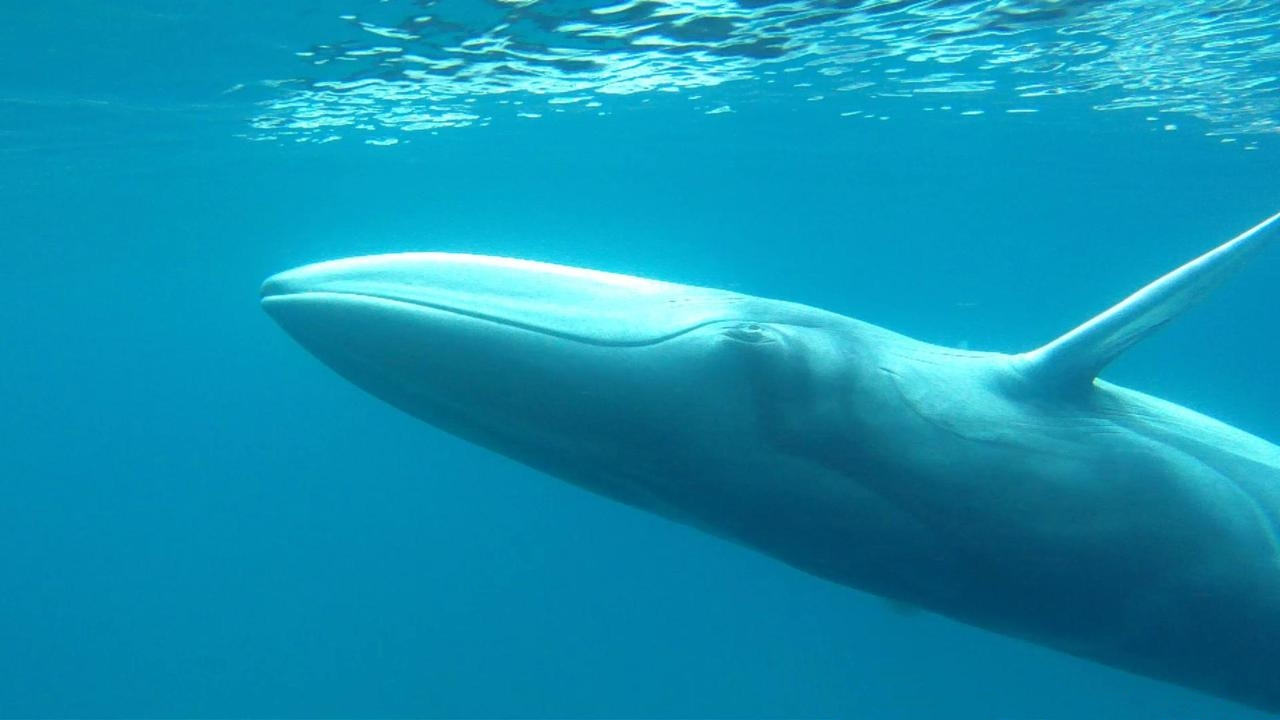
Omura's whale off Nosy Be

Recent studies indicate that adjacent waters around the channel between Nosy Be and Madagascar host a habitat for a notable number of Omura's whale, enabling researchers to conduct field studies of this rare species.

Coral reefs around Nosy Be are impacted by urbanization, the discharge of the sugar industry, and unregulated tourism.

== Administration ==
The island constitutes a department within Diana Region and is organized as the City of Nosy Be (Commune Urbaine de Nosy Be). Its mayor is Mr. Vita Zarga.

== Economy ==
Once a major location of sugar cane plantations and production of its derived products (sugar, rum), the island's main activities are now the plantation of ylang-ylang (for the production of essential oils) and tourism. Nosy Be is the most developed tourism destination in Madagascar. This is the only place in Madagascar where all-inclusive large resorts can be found. There are no traffic lights on the island, instead roundabouts are used.

== Transportation ==
The island is served by Fascene Airport. The airport is served by commercial flights with Air Madagascar, Air Austral, Airlink, Ewa, Ethiopian Airlines, and has direct flights from Europe on Neos. Its main city and harbour, Hell-Ville, can be reached by boat from Ankify. On the island, travel via tuk-tuk, scooters, and boats is common alongside cars.

== Education ==
French international schools:

- École primaire française Lamartine

Local public schools:

- EPP Andavakotoko
- EPP Galliéni
- EPP boulevard Manceaut (?)
- CEG Ambalakatakata
- Lycée mixte of Nosy Be

== Twin towns—sister cities ==
Nosy Be is twinned with:

- Naples, Italy

== See also ==
- List of volcanoes in Madagascar
