= Circles of latitude between the 10th parallel south and the 15th parallel south =

Circles of latitude

Following are circles of latitude between the 10th parallel south and the 15th parallel south:

== 11th parallel south ==
11th parallel south (interactive map)

The 11th parallel south is a circle of latitude that is 11 degrees south of the Earth's equatorial plane. It crosses the Atlantic Ocean, Africa, the Indian Ocean, Australasia, the Pacific Ocean and South America.

=== Around the world ===
Starting at the Prime Meridian and heading eastwards, the parallel 11° south passes through:

Coordinates	Country, territory or sea	Notes
11°0′S 0°0′E	Atlantic Ocean	
11°0′S 13°52′E	Angola	
11°0′S 22°12′E	Democratic Republic of the Congo	
11°0′S 23°20′E	Angola	
11°0′S 23°38′E	Democratic Republic of the Congo	For about 8 km (5.0 mi)
11°0′S 23°43′E	Angola	For about 5 km (3.1 mi)
11°0′S 23°46′E	Democratic Republic of the Congo	For about 13 km (8.1 mi)
11°0′S 23°53′E	Angola	For about 15 km (9.3 mi)
11°0′S 24°1′E	Zambia	For about 13 km (8.1 mi)
11°0′S 24°8′E	Democratic Republic of the Congo	
11°0′S 28°30′E	Zambia	
11°0′S 33°18′E	Malawi	
11°0′S 34°13′E	Lake Malawi	
11°0′S 34°36′E	Tanzania	
11°0′S 39°30′E	Mozambique	
11°0′S 40°30′E	Indian Ocean	
11°0′S 122°52′E	Indonesia	Passing through the island of Dana just south of Rote Island, Indonesia
11°0′S 126°54′E	Timor Sea	Passing just north of Melville Island and the Cobourg Peninsula, Australia
11°0′S 132°33′E	Australia	Croker Island, Northern Territory
11°0′S 132°34′E	Arafura Sea	Passing just north of the Wessel Islands, Australia
11°0′S 142°8′E	Australia	Cape York Peninsula, Queensland
11°0′S 142°44′E	Coral Sea	Passing between islands of the Louisiade Archipelago, Papua New Guinea
11°0′S 152°30′E	Solomon Sea	Passing just north of Rennell Island, Solomon Islands
11°0′S 162°6′E	Coral Sea	Passing just south of Makira island, Solomon Islands; Passing just south of Nendo Island, Solomon Islands; Passing just north of Utupua Island, Solomon Islands
11°0′S 167°26′E	Pacific Ocean	Passing just north of Swains Island, American Samoa (claimed by Tokelau); Passing just south of Pukapuka atoll, Cook Islands
11°0′S 77°40′W	Peru	
11°0′S 70°27′W	Brazil	Acre
11°0′S 70°6′W	Peru	
11°0′S 69°32′W	Bolivia	
11°0′S 68°59′W	Brazil	Acre
11°0′S 68°50′W	Bolivia	
11°0′S 68°47′W	Brazil	Acre - for about 15 km (9.3 mi)
11°0′S 68°19′W	Bolivia	
11°0′S 65°18′W	Brazil	Rondônia; Mato Grosso; Tocantins; Bahia; Sergipe
11°0′S 37°3′W	Atlantic Ocean	

== 12th parallel south ==
12th parallel south (interactive map)

The 12th parallel south is a circle of latitude that is 12 degrees south of the Earth's equatorial plane. It crosses the Atlantic Ocean, Africa, the Indian Ocean, Australasia, the Pacific Ocean and South America.

=== Around the world ===
Starting at the Prime Meridian and heading eastwards, the parallel 12° south passes through:

Coordinates	Country, territory or sea	Notes
12°0′S 0°0′E	Atlantic Ocean	
12°0′S 13°43′E	Angola	
12°0′S 23°59′E	Zambia	
12°0′S 26°42′E	Democratic Republic of the Congo	For about 3 km (1.9 mi)
12°0′S 26°43′E	Zambia	
12°0′S 27°28′E	Democratic Republic of the Congo	
12°0′S 28°45′E	Zambia	
12°0′S 33°18′E	Malawi	
12°0′S 34°4′E	Lake Malawi	Passing just north of Chizumulu Island and Likoma Island, Malawi
12°0′S 34°53′E	Mozambique	
12°0′S 40°32′E	Indian Ocean	Mozambique Channel: Passing just south of Grande Comore island, Comoros; Passing just north of Anjouan island, Comoros
12°0′S 49°12′E	Madagascar	
12°0′S 49°18′E	Indian Ocean	Passing between North Keeling Island and Horsburgh Island, Cocos (Keeling) Islands; Passing just north of the Ashmore and Cartier Islands and Hibernia Reef, Australia
12°0′S 124°22′E	Timor Sea	Passing south of Bathurst Island, Australia; Passing through the Clarence Strait: between Melville Island and the mainland, Australia; Passing through Van Diemen Gulf
12°0′S 132°37′E	Australia	Arnhem Land, Northern Territory
12°0′S 134°17′E	Arafura Sea	Bocaut Bay
12°0′S 134°40′E	Australia	Arnhem Land, Northern Territory
12°0′S 134°45′E	Arafura Sea	Castlereagh Bay - passing just south of Mooroongga Island, Australia
12°0′S 135°34′E	Australia	Elcho Island and Arnhem Land (mainland), Northern Territory
12°0′S 135°49′E	Arafura Sea	
12°0′S 136°16′E	Australia	Inglis Island and Arnhem Land (mainland), Northern Territory
12°0′S 136°31′E	Gulf of Carpentaria	
12°0′S 141°50′E	Australia	Cape York Peninsula, Queensland
12°0′S 143°11′E	Coral Sea	Passing just south of Vanatinai island, Papua New Guinea; Passing just south of Rennell Island, Solomon Islands; Passing just south of Vanikoro island, Solomon Islands
12°0′S 167°37′E	Pacific Ocean	Passing just north of Tikopia island, Solomon Islands
12°0′S 77°8′W	Peru	Passing just north of Lima
12°0′S 68°55′W	Bolivia	
12°0′S 65°0′W	Brazil	Rondônia; Mato Grosso; Tocantins; Bahia
12°0′S 37°37′W	Atlantic Ocean	

== 13th parallel south ==
13th parallel south (interactive map)

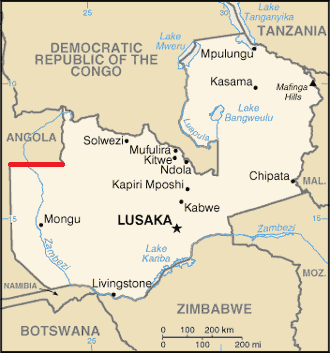
The 13th parallel south defines part of Zambia's border with Angola.

The 13th parallel south is a circle of latitude that is 13 degrees south of the Earth's equatorial plane. It crosses the Atlantic Ocean, Africa, the Indian Ocean, Australasia, the Pacific Ocean and South America.

Part of the border between Angola and Zambia is defined by the parallel.

=== Around the world ===
Starting at the Prime Meridian and heading eastwards, the parallel 13° south passes through:

Coordinates	Country, territory or sea	Notes
13°0′S 0°0′E	Atlantic Ocean	
13°0′S 12°57′E	Angola	
13°0′S 22°0′E	Angola / Zambia border	
13°0′S 24°2′E	Zambia	
13°0′S 28°49′E	Democratic Republic of the Congo	
13°0′S 29°48′E	Zambia	
13°0′S 33°0′E	Malawi	
13°0′S 34°19′E	Lake Malawi	
13°0′S 34°46′E	Mozambique	Passing through Pemba Bay
13°0′S 40°35′E	Indian Ocean	Mozambique Channel
13°0′S 45°8′E	France	Overseas department of Mayotte
13°0′S 45°9′E	Indian Ocean	Mozambique Channel
13°0′S 48°54′E	Madagascar	
13°0′S 49°53′E	Indian Ocean	
13°0′S 125°49′E	Timor Sea	
13°0′S 130°8′E	Australia	Northern Territory
13°0′S 136°39′E	Gulf of Carpentaria	
13°0′S 141°35′E	Australia	Cape York Peninsula, Queensland
13°0′S 143°31′E	Coral Sea	Passing just north of the Torres Islands, Vanuatu
13°0′S 167°47′E	Pacific Ocean	Passing north of Wallis Island, Wallis and Futuna
13°0′S 76°30′W	Peru	Cerro Azul, Cañete
13°0′S 68°58′W	Bolivia	
13°0′S 62°47′W	Brazil	Rondônia - for about 3 km
13°0′S 62°46′W	Bolivia	For about 12 km
13°0′S 62°39′W	Brazil	Rondônia; Mato Grosso; Goiás; Tocantins; Goiás; Tocantins; Goiás; Bahia - mainland, Itaparica Island and the mainland again (city of Salvador)
13°0′S 38°26′W	Atlantic Ocean	

== 14th parallel south ==
14th parallel south (interactive map)

The 14th parallel south is a circle of latitude that is 14 degrees south of the Earth's equatorial plane. It crosses the Atlantic Ocean, Africa, the Indian Ocean, Australasia, the Pacific Ocean and South America.

=== Around the world ===
Starting at the Prime Meridian and heading eastwards, the parallel 14° south passes through:

Coordinates	Country, territory or sea	Notes
14°0′S 0°0′E	Atlantic Ocean	
14°0′S 12°24′E	Angola	
14°0′S 22°0′E	Zambia	
14°0′S 32°59′E	Malawi	For about 8 km (5.0 mi)
14°0′S 33°4′E	Zambia	For about 15 km (9.3 mi)
14°0′S 33°13′E	Malawi	Passing just south of Lilongwe; Passing through Lake Malawi
14°0′S 35°20′E	Mozambique	
14°0′S 40°38′E	Indian Ocean	Mozambique Channel
14°0′S 47°46′E	Madagascar	Island of Nosy Berafia
14°0′S 47°48′E	Indian Ocean	Mozambique Channel
14°0′S 47°58′E	Madagascar	
14°0′S 50°8′E	Indian Ocean	
14°0′S 125°58′E	Australia	Western Australia - passing through Vansittart Bay and Napier Broome Bay
14°0′S 127°28′E	Joseph Bonaparte Gulf	
14°0′S 129°43′E	Australia	Northern Territory
14°0′S 135°54′E	Gulf of Carpentaria	
14°0′S 136°25′E	Australia	Groote Eylandt, Northern Territory
14°0′S 136°45′E	Gulf of Carpentaria	
14°0′S 141°31′E	Australia	Cape York Peninsula, Queensland
14°0′S 143°40′E	Coral Sea	Passing just south of Osprey Reef, Australia's Coral Sea Islands Territory; Passing between the islands of Vanua Lava and Gaua, Vanuatu
14°0′S 167°58′E	Pacific Ocean	Passing just north of Futuna Island, Wallis and Futuna
14°0′S 171°50′W	Samoa	Island of Upolu
14°0′S 171°25′W	Pacific Ocean	Passing just north of Tutuila island, American Samoa; Passing just north of the Ofu-Olosega islands, American Samoa; Passing just north of the Disappointment Islands, French Polynesia
14°0′S 76°17′W	Peru	
14°0′S 68°57′W	Bolivia	
14°0′S 60°24′W	Brazil	Mato Grosso; Goiás; Bahia
14°0′S 38°55′W	Atlantic Ocean	

== 15th parallel south ==
15th parallel south (interactive map)

The 15th parallel south is a circle of latitude that is 15 degrees south of the Earth's equatorial plane. It crosses the Atlantic Ocean, Africa, the Indian Ocean, Australasia, the Pacific Ocean and South America.

=== Around the world ===
Starting at the Prime Meridian and heading eastwards, the parallel 15° south passes through:

Coordinates	Country, territory or ocean	Notes
15°0′S 0°0′E	Atlantic Ocean	
15°0′S 12°9′E	Angola	
15°0′S 22°0′E	Zambia	
15°0′S 30°13′E	Mozambique	
15°0′S 34°37′E	Malawi	
15°0′S 35°52′E	Mozambique	
15°0′S 40°39′E	Indian Ocean	Mozambique Channel - passing just north of the Island of Mozambique
15°0′S 47°13′E	Madagascar	
15°0′S 50°20′E	Indian Ocean	
15°0′S 124°54′E	Australia	Western Australia - Passing through the Coronation Islands, Prince Frederick Harbour and Cambridge Gulf; Northern Territory
15°0′S 135°31′E	Indian Ocean	Gulf of Carpentaria
15°0′S 141°40′E	Australia	Queensland
15°0′S 145°20′E	Pacific Ocean	Coral Sea
15°0′S 166°35′E	Vanuatu	Island of Espiritu Santo - passing through Big Bay
15°0′S 167°3′E	Pacific Ocean	Coral Sea
15°0′S 168°6′E	Vanuatu	Island of Maewo
15°0′S 168°8′E	Pacific Ocean	Passing just south of Mataiva atoll, French Polynesia
15°0′S 148°17′W	French Polynesia	Passing through Tikehau and Rangiroa atolls
15°0′S 147°35′W	Pacific Ocean	Passing just north of Arutua atoll, French Polynesia; Passing just south of the island of Tikei, French Polynesia; Passing just south of Puka-Puka atoll, French Polynesia
15°0′S 75°28′W	Peru	
15°0′S 69°21′W	Bolivia	
15°0′S 60°24′W	Brazil	Mato Grosso; Goiás - for about 12 km Mato Grosso - for about 8 km Goiás; Minas Gerais; Bahia; Minas Gerais; Bahia
15°0′S 39°0′W	Atlantic Ocean	

== See also ==
- Circles of latitude between the 5th parallel south and the 10th parallel south
- Circles of latitude between the 15th parallel south and the 20th parallel south
