= Ankarangona =

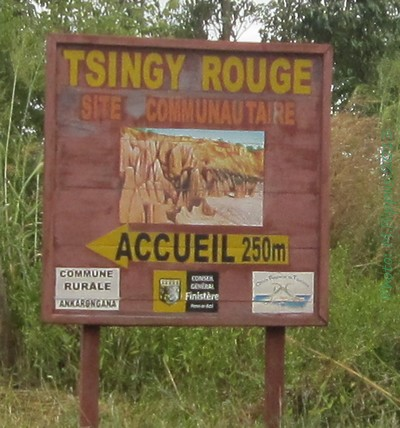
- The Tsingy Rouge

- Location in Madagascar
- Coordinates: 12°39′S 49°26′E
- Country: Madagascar
- Region: Diana
- District: Antsiranana II
- Elevation: 70 m (230 ft)

Population (2001)
  - Total: 5,610
- Time zone: UTC3 (EAT)

Ankarangona is a town and commune (Malagasy: kaominina) in Madagascar. It belongs to the district of Antsiranana II, which is a part of Diana Region. According to 2001 census the population of Ankarangona was 5,610.

Only primary schooling is available in town. The majority 95% of the population are farmers, while an additional 3.5% receives their livelihood from raising livestock. The most important crops are rice and tomatoes; also cucumber is an important agricultural product. Services provide employment for 0.5% of the population. Additionally fishing employs 1% of the population.

== Attractions ==
The Tsingy Rouge on the Irodo River are located in this municipality
