= Antsakoabe =

- Village
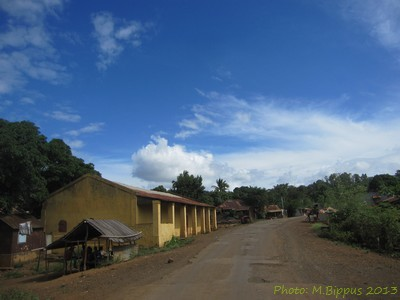

- Location in Madagascar
- Coordinates: 12°40′10″S 49°17′36″E
- Country: Madagascar
- Region: Diana
- District: Antsiranana II
- Elevation: 352 m (1,155 ft)

Population (2001)
  - Total: unknown
- Time zone: UTC3 (EAT)

Antsakoabe is a town in Madagascar. It belongs to the district of Antsiranana II, which is a part of Diana Region.

== Geography ==
Antsakoabe is situated at the Route Nationale 6 between Sadjoavato and Anivorano Nord at a distance of 65 km from Antsiranana.
