= Sakaramy =

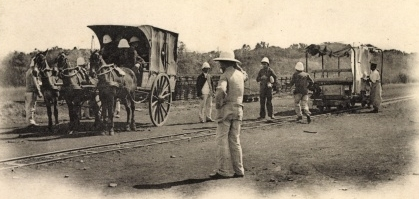
- Unloading the post at the narrow-gauge railway station of Sakaramy, c.a. 1905

- Location in Madagascar
- Coordinates: 12°27′S 49°16′E
- Country: Madagascar
- Region: Diana
- District: Antsiranana II
- Established: 2004

Government
  - Mayor: Andrianasolo Solofonirina
- Elevation: 350 m (1,150 ft)

Population (2012)
  - Total: 3,400
  - Ethnicities: Antandroy Tsimihety Antemoro
- Time zone: UTC3 (EAT)
- Postal code: 202
- Website: Web site Sakaramy

Sakaramy is a rural municipality in Madagascar, 22 km from Antsiranana (Diego Suarez). It belongs to the district of Antsiranana II, which is a part of Diana Region. The population of the municipality was estimated to be approximately 3400 in 2012.

It is situated between Antanamitarana and Joffreville. 5 villages belong to this municipality: Sakaramy centre, Mahatsinjo, Ambdimadiro, Sahasifotra and Ankazomibaboka.

== Nature ==
The fish Pachypanchax sakaramyi was described from this locality. The Lake Mahery is an interesting site for birdwatching that is found inside the Montagne d'Ambre National Park.

== Sports ==
- Avenir Sakaramy (football)

== History ==
Sakaramy was the terminus of the Decauville railway from Diégo Suarez to Sakaramy, which had been built in 1900–1904.

Until 1975 the French Foreign legion had a camp at Sakaramy.
