= Besokatra River =

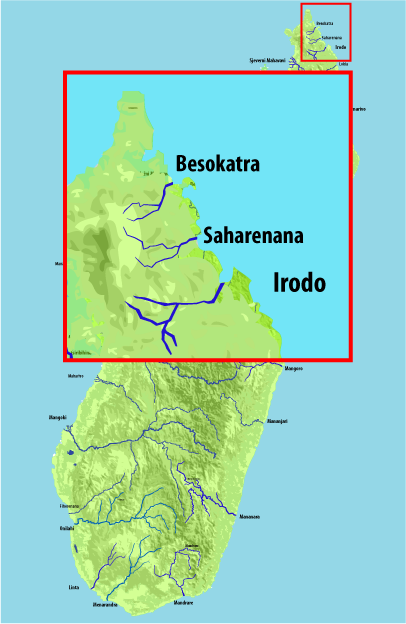
- Ambohitra Massif river system

Location
- Country: Madagascar
- Region: Diana
- City: Mahavanona

Physical characteristics
- Source
  - location: near Joffreville, Diana
  - elevation: 1,332 m (4,370 ft)
- Mouth
  - location: Indian Ocean
  - coordinates: 12°23′00″S 49°26′33″E
  - elevation: 0 m (0 ft)
- Length: 61.8 km (38.4 mi)
- Basin size: 113.4 km^{2} (43.8 sq mi)
- Discharge
  - location: Mahavanona1980-1983
  - average: 1.5 m^{3}/s (53 cu ft/s)1980-1983
  - minimum: 0.143 m^{3}/s (5.0 cu ft/s)
  - maximum: 4.73 m^{3}/s (167 cu ft/s)
- Bauduin & Servat, Etude d'Hydrologie à usage Agricole - ORSTOM pp.1-829 - page 12–14

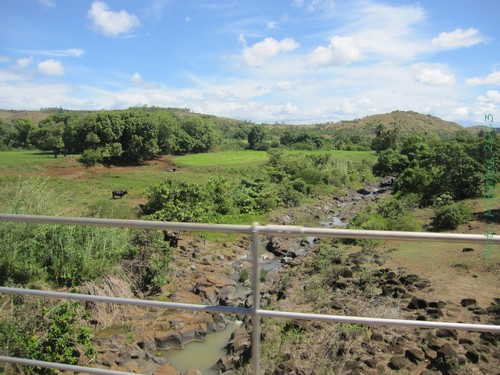
Besokatra river seen from bridge of the RN6 (near Mahavanona (Diana))

The Besokatra River is located in northern Madagascar. Its sources are situated near Joffreville in the Amber Mountain National Park, in the Ambohitra Massif, it crosses the Route nationale 6 near Mahavanona and flows into the Indian Ocean.

The water supplies of Diego Suarez depend entirely of water from the Besokatra river bassin.
