= Mahavanona =

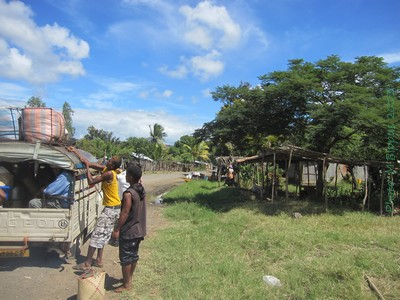
- crossing Mahavanona

- Location in Madagascar
- Coordinates: 12°27′S 49°22′E
- Country: Madagascar
- Region: Diana
- District: Antsiranana II
- Elevation: 115 m (377 ft)

Population (2018)
  - Total: 14,235
- Time zone: UTC3 (EAT)
- Postal code: 202

Mahavanona is a rural municipality in northern Madagascar. It belongs to the district of Antsiranana II, which is a part of Diana Region. It is situated at 20km from Diego Suarez (Antsiranana) on the Route nationale 6 to Anivorano Nord and Ambilobe. This town the located at the Besokatra River.

In 2018 it had a population of 14235.

Junior level secondary education are available in town. The majority 52% of the population are farmers, while an additional 46% receives their livelihood from raising livestock. The most important crop is rice, while other important products are bananas and maize. Services provide employment for 1% of the population. Additionally fishing employs 1% of the population.
