= Andrafiabe =

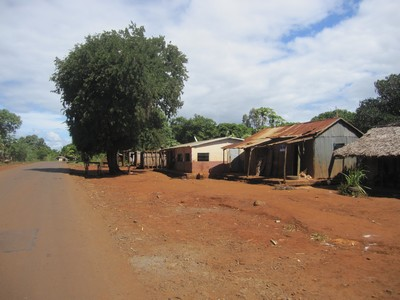

- Location in Madagascar
- Coordinates: 12°31′S 49°24′E
- Country: Madagascar
- Region: Diana
- District: Antsiranana II
- Elevation: 138 m (453 ft)

Population (2001)
  - Total: 2,080
- Time zone: UTC3 (EAT)

Andrafiabe is a town and commune (Malagasy: kaominina) in Madagascar. It belongs to the district of Antsiranana II, which is a part of Diana Region. According to 2001 commune census the population of Andrafiabe was 2,080.

Only primary schooling is available in town. The majority 75% of the population are farmers, while an additional 15% receives their livelihood from raising livestock. The most important crops are rice and coconut; also sugarcane is an important agricultural product. Additionally fishing employs 10% of the population.

== Geography ==
Andrafiabe is situated at the Route nationale 6 between Diego Suarez and Anivorano Nord.
