= Antsahampano =

- Location in Madagascar
- Coordinates: 12°19′S 49°11′E
- Country: Madagascar
- Region: Diana
- District: Antsiranana II
- Elevation: 28 m (92 ft)

Population (2001)
  - Total: 7,624
- Time zone: UTC3 (EAT)

Antsahampano is a town and commune (Malagasy: kaominina) in Madagascar. It belongs to the district of Antsiranana II, which is a part of Diana Region. According to 2001 commune census the population of Antsahampano was 7,624.

Antsahampano has a maritime harbour. Only primary schooling is available in town. The majority (60%) of the population are farmers, while an additional 25% receive their livelihood from raising livestock. The most important crop is maize, while other important products are onions, rice and tomatoes. Industry and services provide employment for 5% and 4% of the population, respectively. Additionally fishing employs 6% of the population.
