= Ambondromifehy =

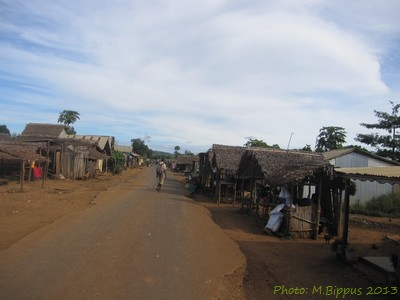
- crossing Ambondromifehy

- Location in Madagascar
- Coordinates: 12°54′S 49°12′E
- Country: Madagascar
- Region: Diana
- Elevation: 314 m (1,030 ft)

Population
  - Total: unknown
- Time zone: UTC3 (EAT)

Ambondromifehy (Malagasy: kaominina) is a town and commune in Madagascar. It is located on the Route nationale 6 between Anivorano Nord and Ambilobe near the Ankarana Reserve. It is known for sapphire mining and trading.
