= Antanamitarana =

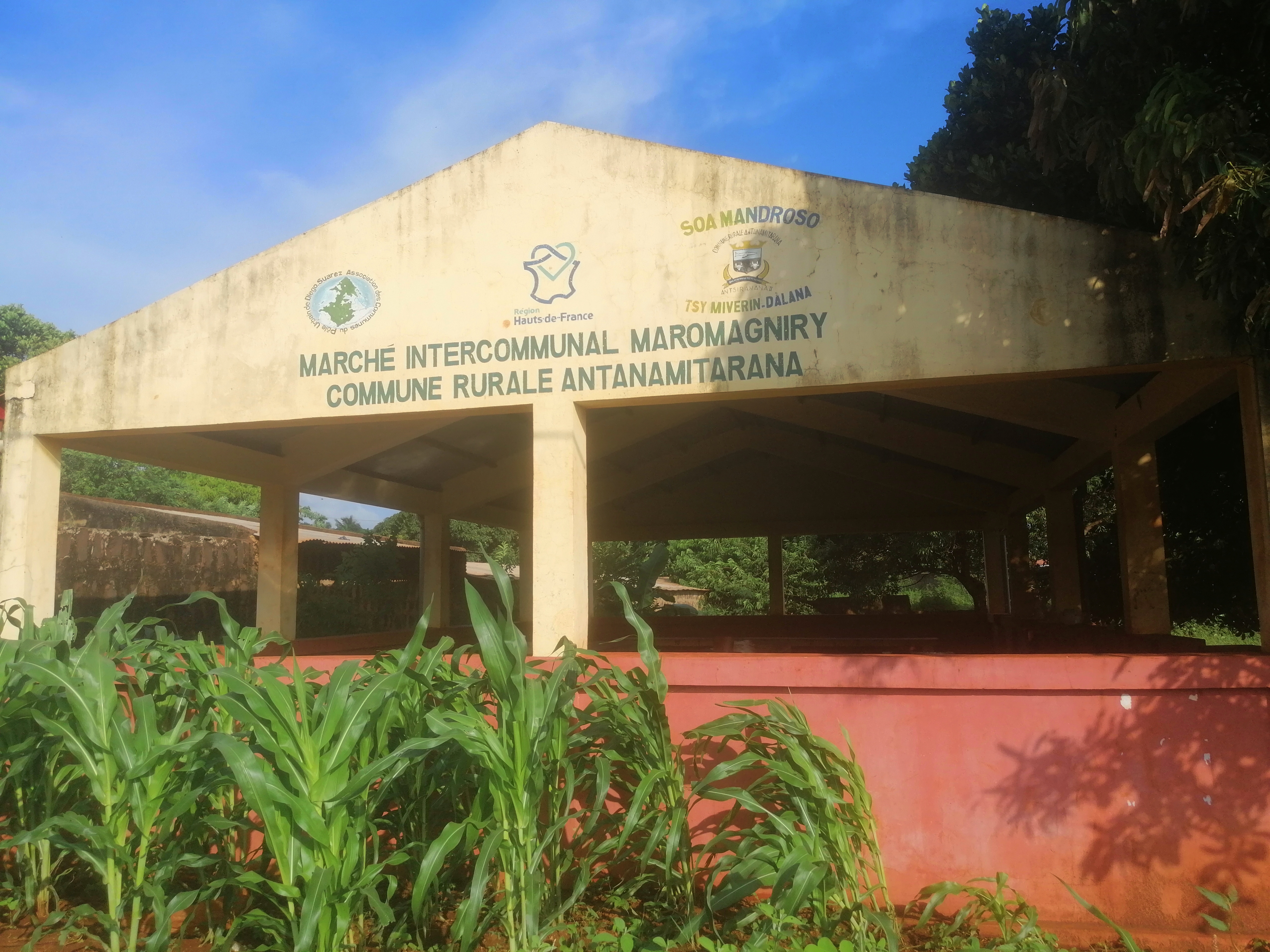

- Location in Madagascar
- Coordinates: 12°23′S 49°18′E
- Country: Madagascar
- Region: Diana
- District: Antsiranana II
- Established: 2002

Government
  - Mayor: Anondaza Amina

Area
  - Land: 76 km^{2} (29 sq mi)
- Elevation: 120 m (390 ft)

Population (2016)
  - Total: 6,227
- Time zone: UTC3 (EAT)
- Postal code: 202

Antanamitarana is a rural municipality in Madagascar. It belongs to the district of Antsiranana II, which is a part of Diana Region, and a part of the Diego Suarez province. The population of the municipality was estimated to be approximately 6,227 in 2016.

It is situated at 8 km South of Diego Suarez, on the National Road 6. The airport of Diego Suarez is in this municipality. 5 villages belong to this municipality: Maromagniry, Antafiamalama, Antanamitarana, Ambodimagnary and Ambodimanga.

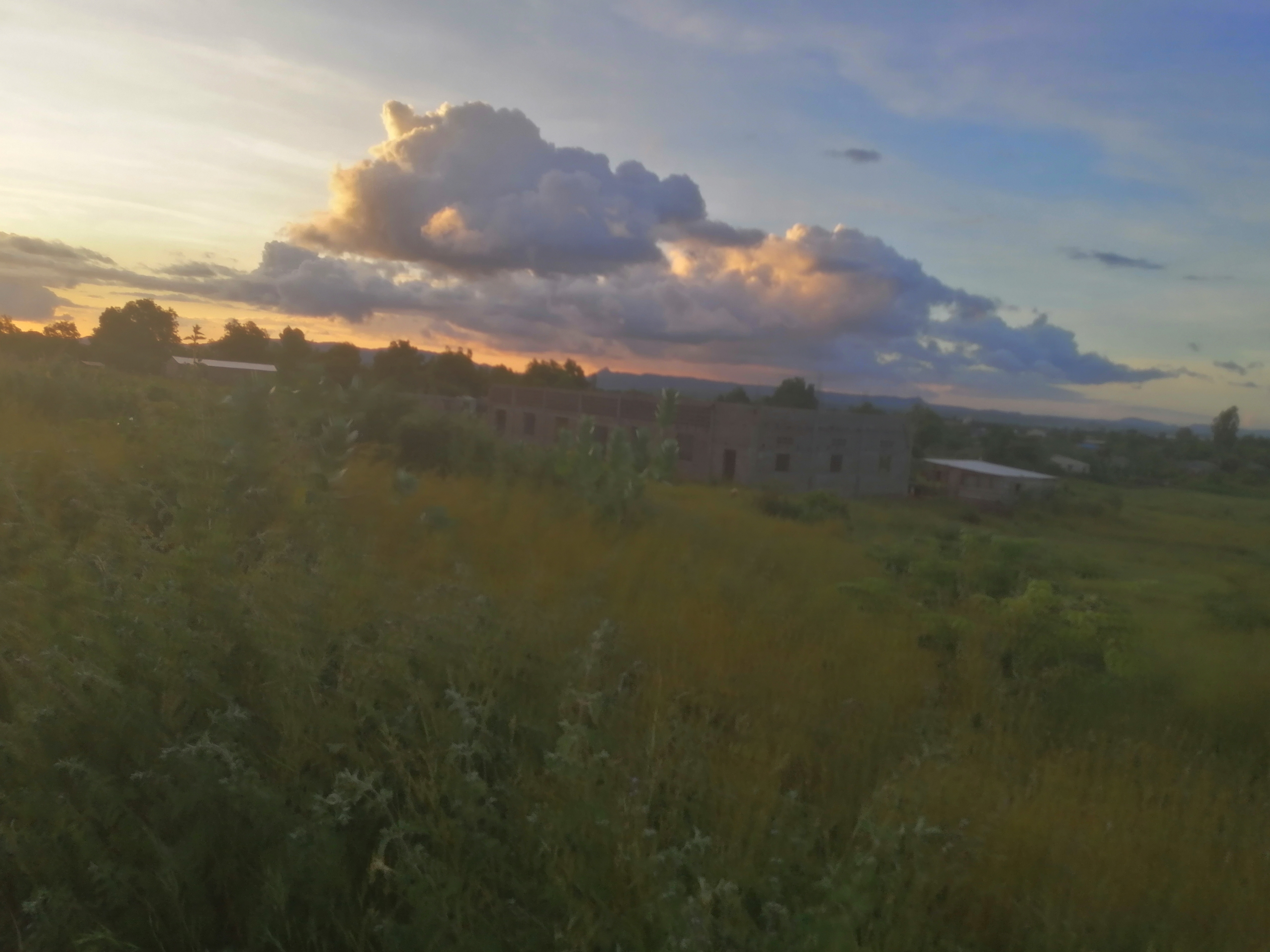
sunset

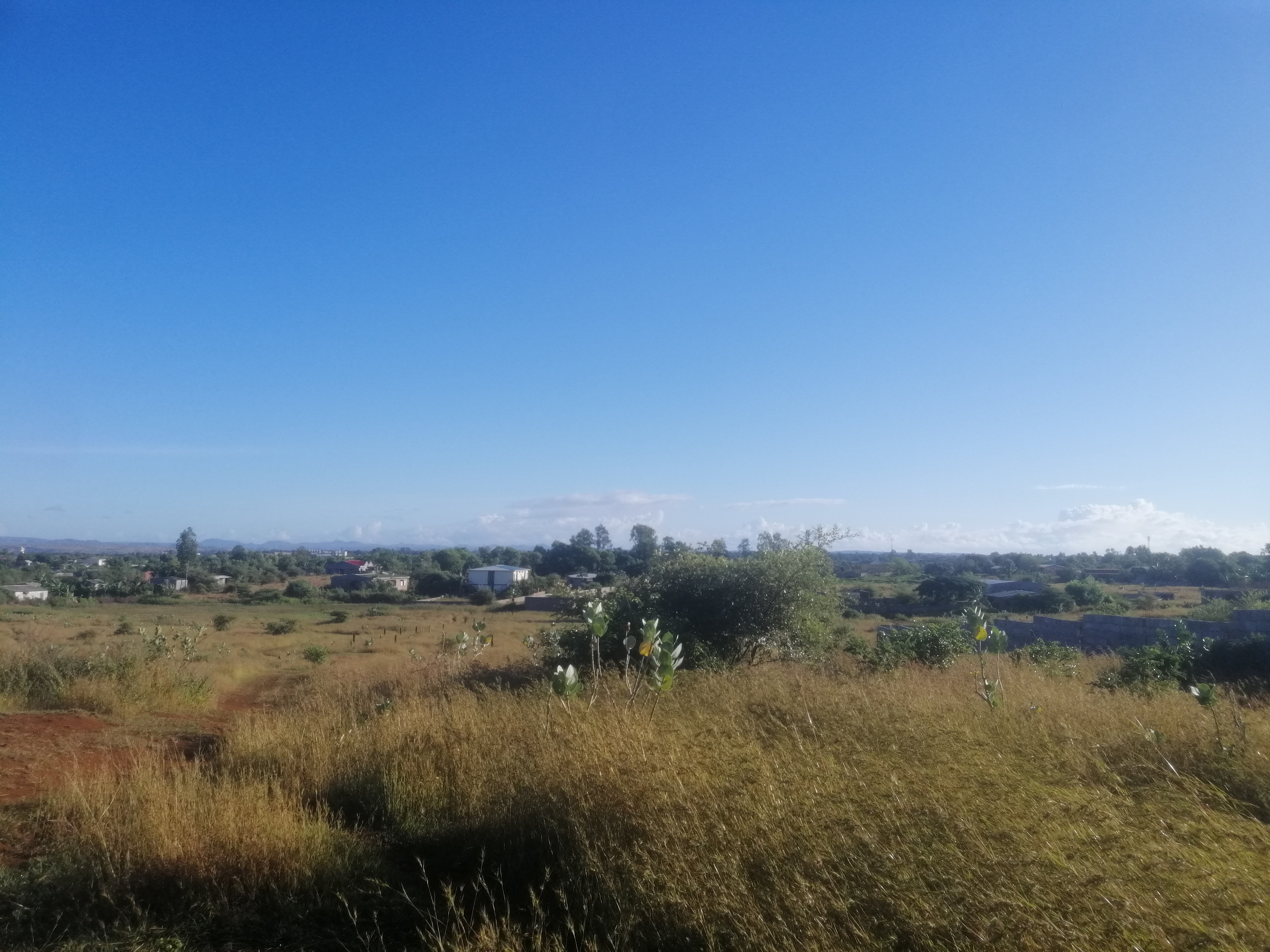
Western part of Fokontany Maromagniry

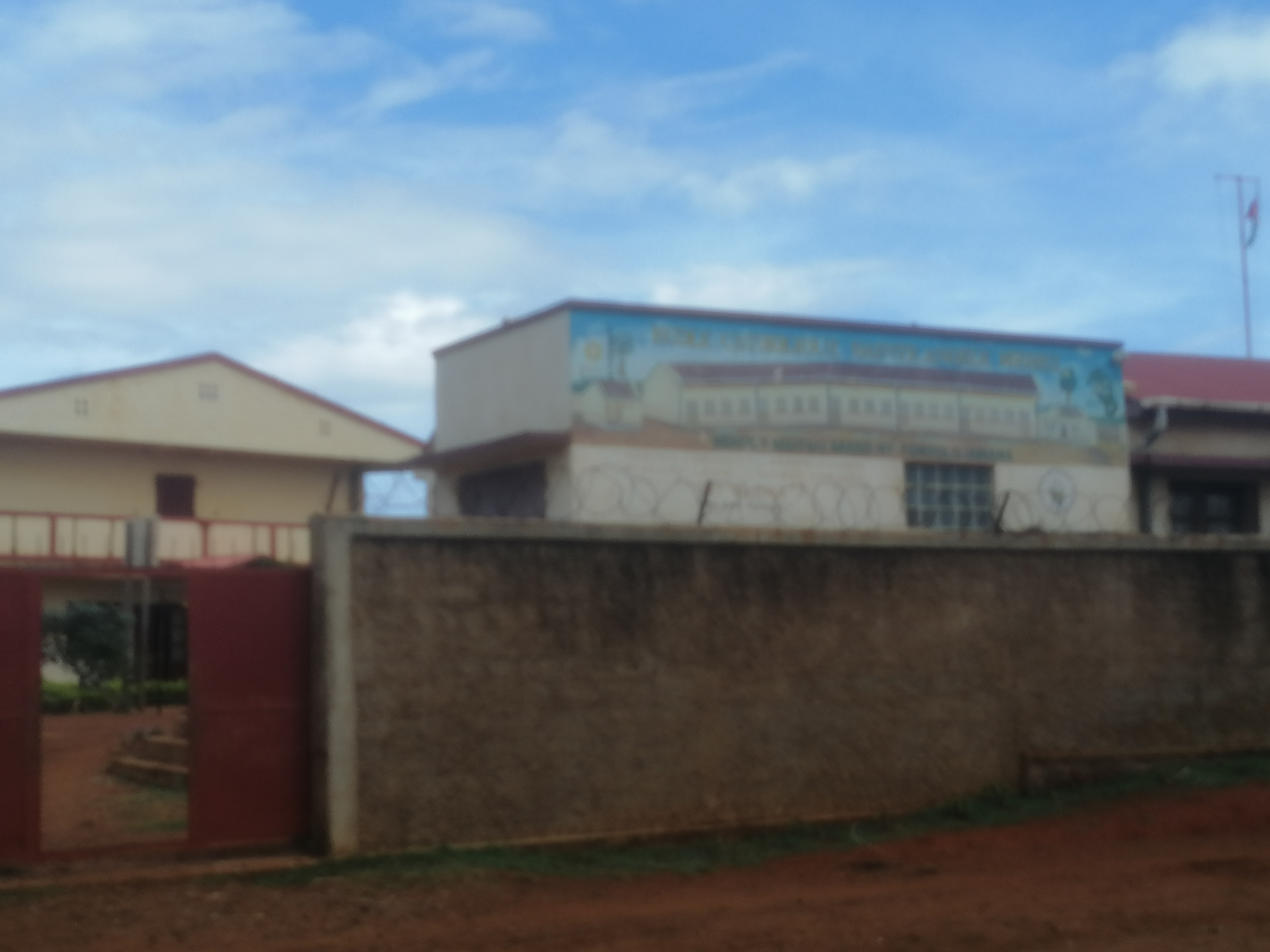
Catholic school of Maromagniry

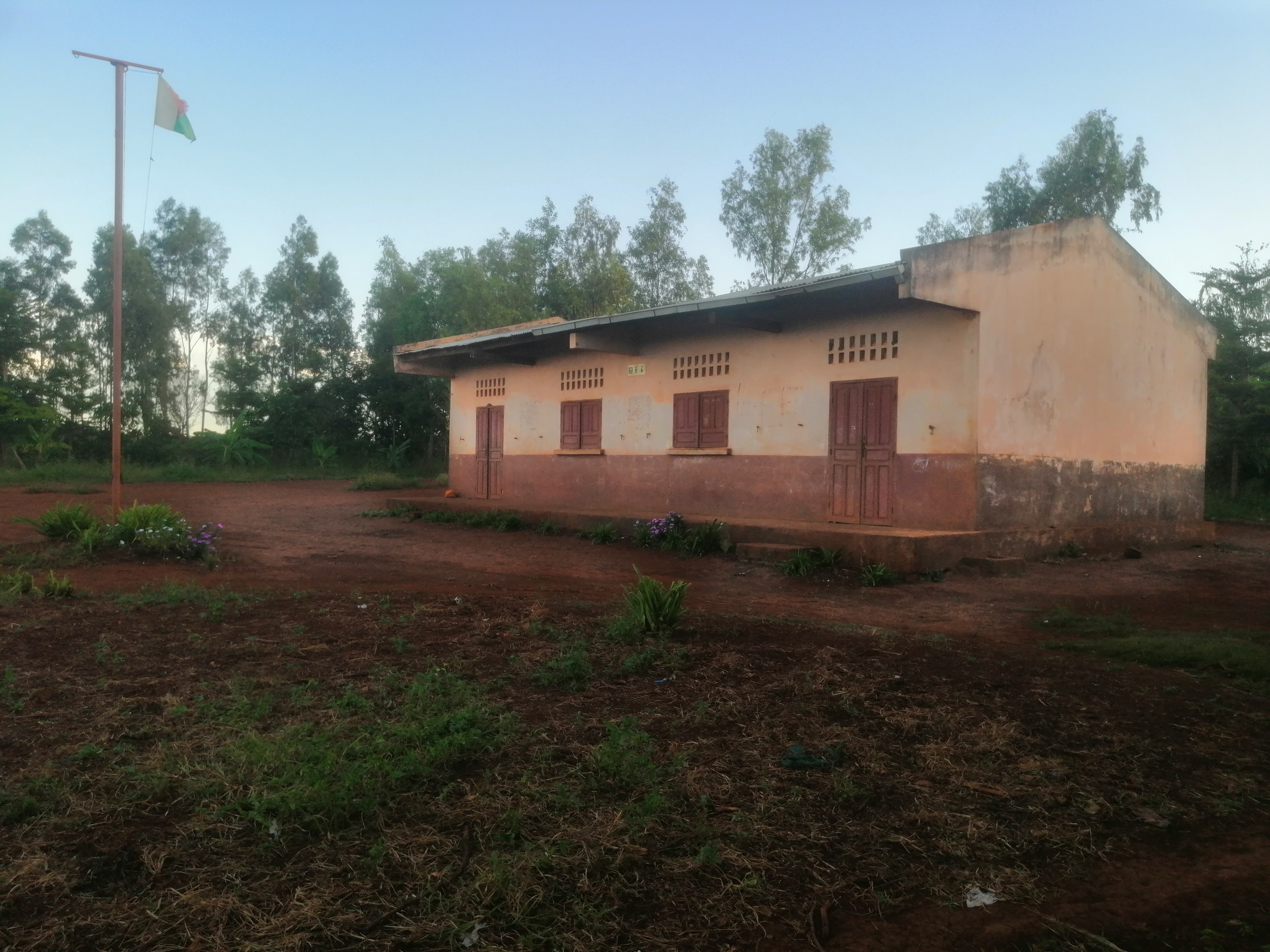
School of EPP Ambodimanga, Antanamitarana

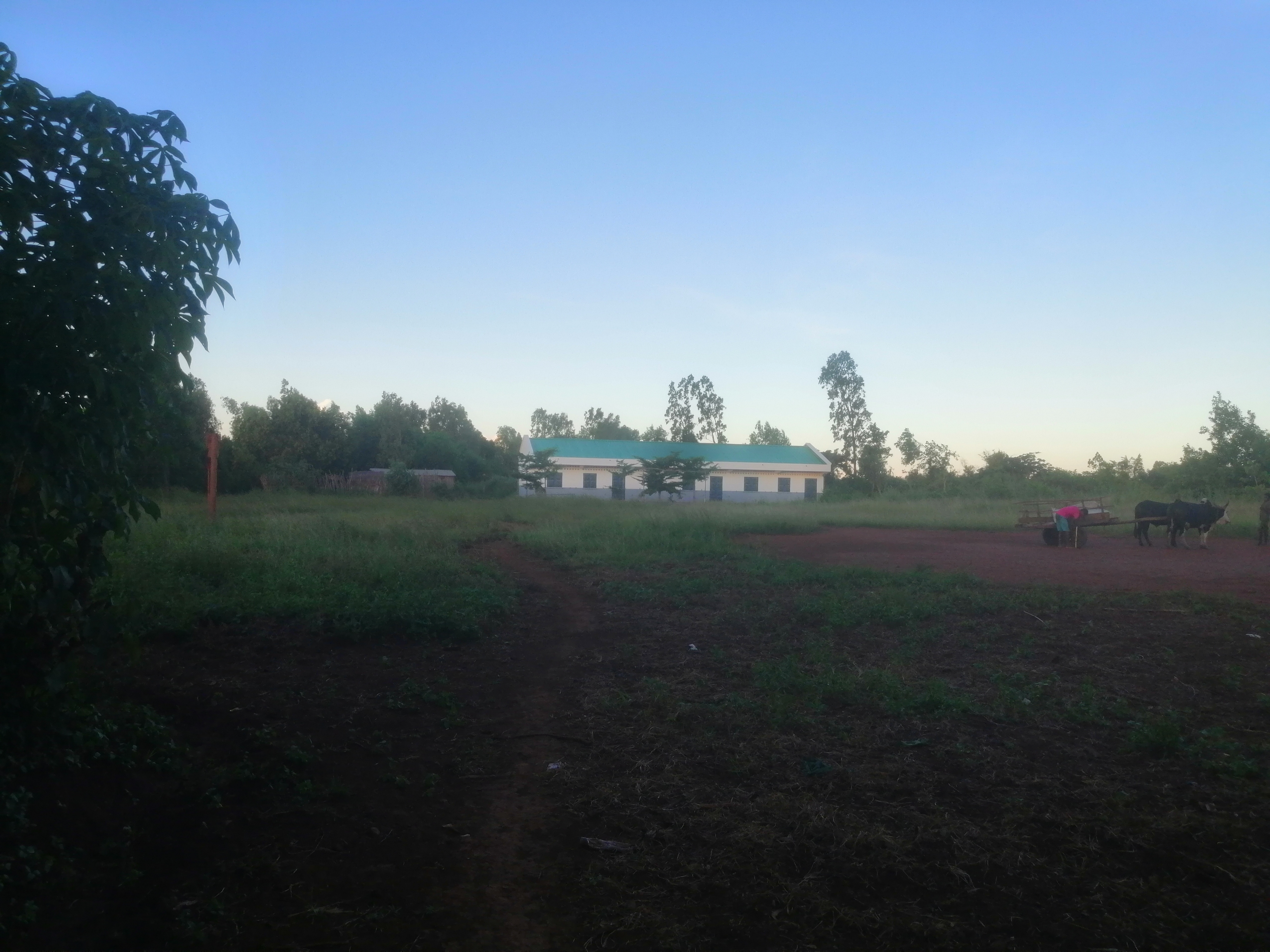
School of EPP Ambodimanga, Antanamitarana
