= Decauville railway at Diégo Suarez =

Narrow gauge railway in Madagascar

Coordinates: 12.3805°S 49.3054°E

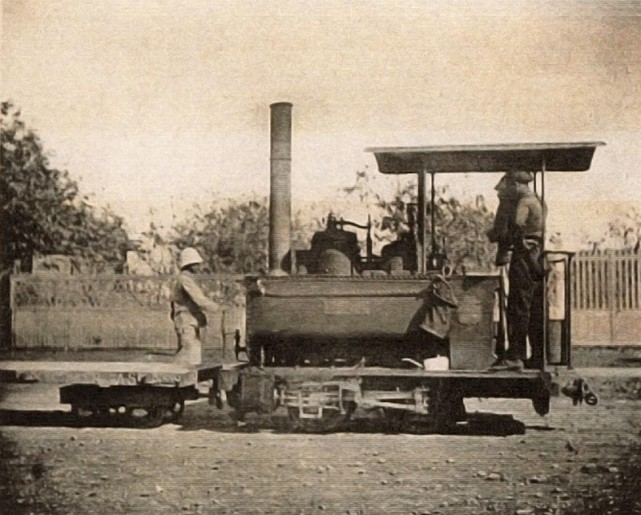

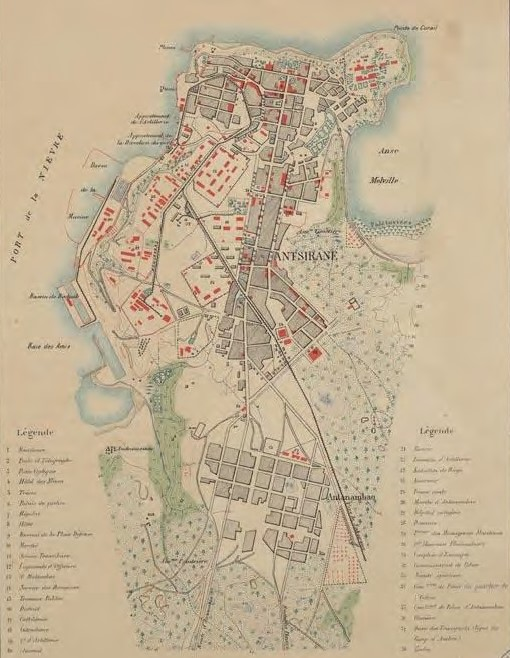
- Route in Antsirane, 1912

Technical
- Line length: 24 km (15 mi)
- Track gauge: 600 mm (1 ft 11 5/8 in)
- Minimum radius: 40 m (130 ft)
- Operating speed: Uphill: 11 km/h (7 mph); Downhill: 30 km/h (19 mph)

The Diego Suarez Decauville railway was a 24 km (15 mi) long 600 mm (1 ft 11 5/8 in) gauge military railway from Antsirane to Sakaramy in Madagascar.

== Construction and route ==
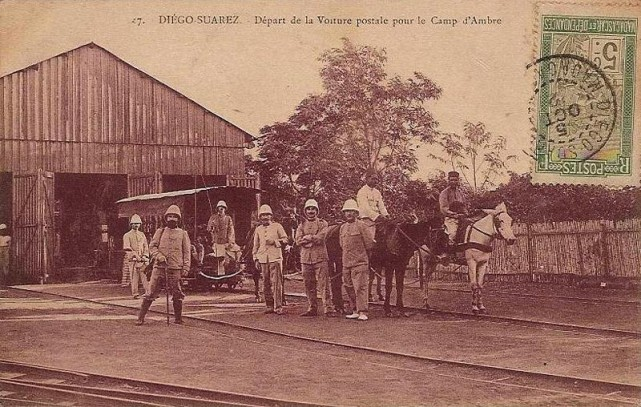
Departure of the post train in Antsirane

The 600 mm (1 ft 11 5/8 in) gauge Decauville railway was built in 1900 from Antsirane (now Antsiranana) to the Tunisian Fountain (Fontaine Tunisienne) at today's STAR factory. It started at the port and ran on the Rue Gouraud and the Boulevard Bazeilles up to the Cercle Français (now Suarez Art) and up the Boulevard Militaire. It turned into the Boulevard de Sakaramy at the height of Camp Lubert, from where it led past the present town hall to l'Octroi and the Tunisian Fountain. At the end of 1900, it was extended from the Tunisian Fountain via Antanamitara and Andranomanitra to the junction of today's road to Joffreville.

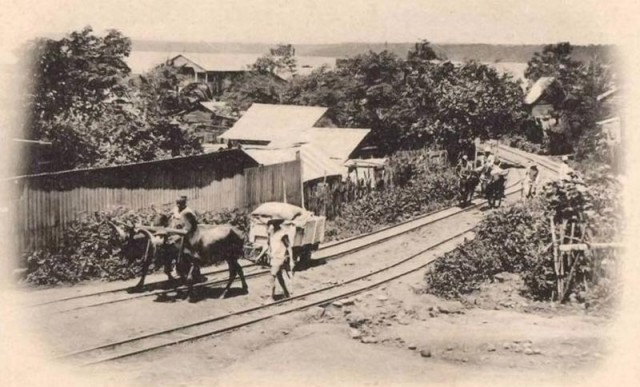
Ox-drawn goods train on the Boulevard Bazeilles

The route was designed by Captain Brunet to generally follow the terrain and thus to avoid large earthworks. At the Gorge of Antanamitara, a curve with a radius of only 40 m (44 yd) was needed. A 6.30 metres (20.7 ft) deep cut and a bridge diagonally across the ravine had to be built. For track construction, Type No. 10 Decauville rails weighing 9.5 kg/m (19 lbs/yd) with 8 sleepers per 5 metres (16 ft) long element. Due to delivery difficulties, rails with 7.5 kg/m (15 lbs/yd) were occasionally used in some sections, which had to be replaced at a later stage.

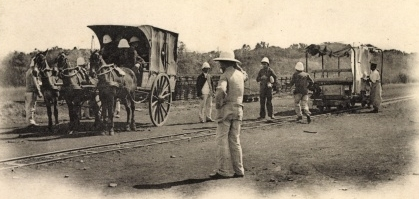
Postal horse cart from Sakaramy to Camp d’Ambre

Construction of the initially 13 km (8.1 mi) long track was carried out by civilian entrepreneurs from Antsirane under the direction of engineer-captain Fénéon. Initially, the track was not ballasted, which excluded the use of a locomotive. The track was partly owned by the military administration and partly by private entities. Rails were laid onto the quays in the harbour, leading to various warehouses. The line was completed in 1904 to Sakaramy with a length of 24 km (15 mi). The originally planned 10 km (6.2 mi) long extension to the military barracks at Camp d'Ambre in Joffreville at an altitude of about 634 m (2,080 ft) above sea level was never built.

== Operation ==
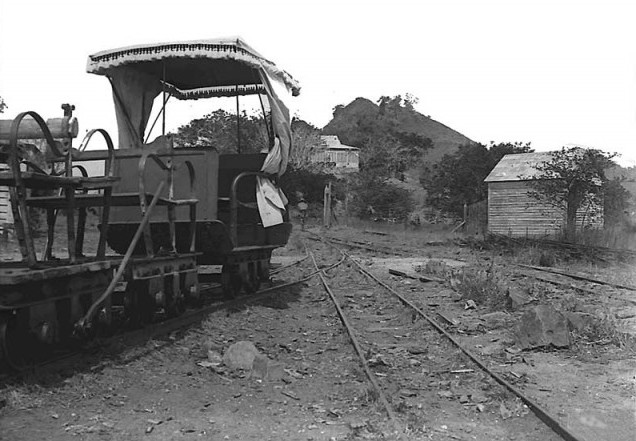
Decauville passenger carts

The goods and passenger trains were initially pulled by oxen or large mules, respectively, and later in the lower part between the port and the Tunisian Fountain by steam locomotives. From 1904, animal traction was occasionally substituted by three steam locomotives. For the downhill gravity run, the cars were uncoupled and braked with two independently acting brakes.

A road was built between Sakaramy and Camp d'Ambre in 1908 instead of extending the narrow-gauge railway. Due to a lack of maintenance of the tracks and steam locomotives as well as due to supply problems of spare parts and coal, the steam operation was discontinued in 1908, but animal-drawn trains continued to be operated. In 1911, trains were still running on Mondays, Tuesdays, Thursdays and Saturdays. During the war between 1914 and 1918, there was only one round trip per week. At least sections of the route were still used in 1925 and 1936.

== Locomotives ==
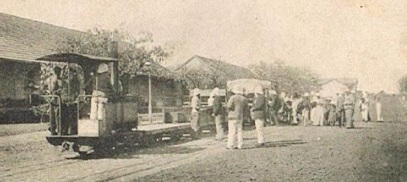
Decauville steam engine

At least three 0-4-0T Decauville steam locomotives, including the 3.5 t N° 342/1901, were used on the track. One of the three Decauville locomotives, La Mignonne, was presented the Exposition Universelle 1889 in Paris, before being exported to Madagascar. After its retirement, it was finally shipped to Asia.
