= Antsiranana Bay =

Natural bay along the northeast coast of Madagascar

Bay of Diego Suarez
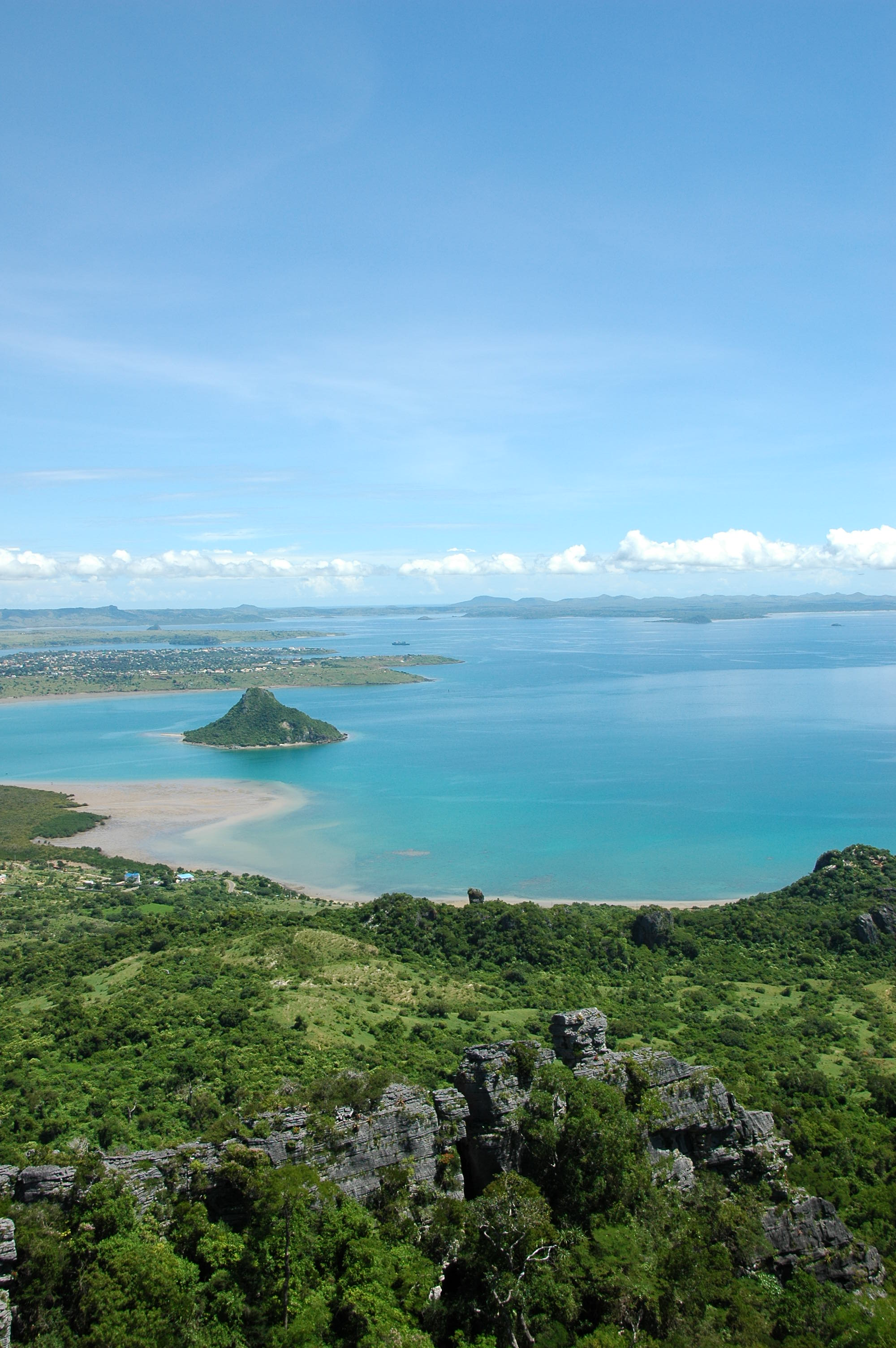

- Location in Madagascar
- Location: Diana, Madagascar
- Coordinates: 12°13′50″S 49°17′34″E
- Ocean/sea sources: Indian Ocean
- Basin countries: Madagascar
- Settlements: Antsiranana

Antsiranana Bay (also known as Diego-Suarez Bay) is a natural bay that stretches close to 20 kilometres (12 mi) north to south along the northeast coast of Madagascar. The waters average a depth of more than 20 metres (66 ft), and the main channel can be as deep as 50 metres (160 ft). The bay, protected by a narrow inlet that provides shelter from strong Indian Ocean winds, is believed to be the result of a submerging coastline or a drowned river valley that formed many peninsulas around the bay.

The bay's principal city, Antsiranana, is located on a headland.

== History ==
The bay was first recorded by European explorers in 1500; sailors in the service of Portugal named the bay for the leader of their expedition, Diogo Soares. The bay was later used for shelter by a number of pirates and privateers during the Golden Age of Piracy, and it has been speculated as a possible location of the legendary pirate colony Libertalia.
