= Andranovondronina =

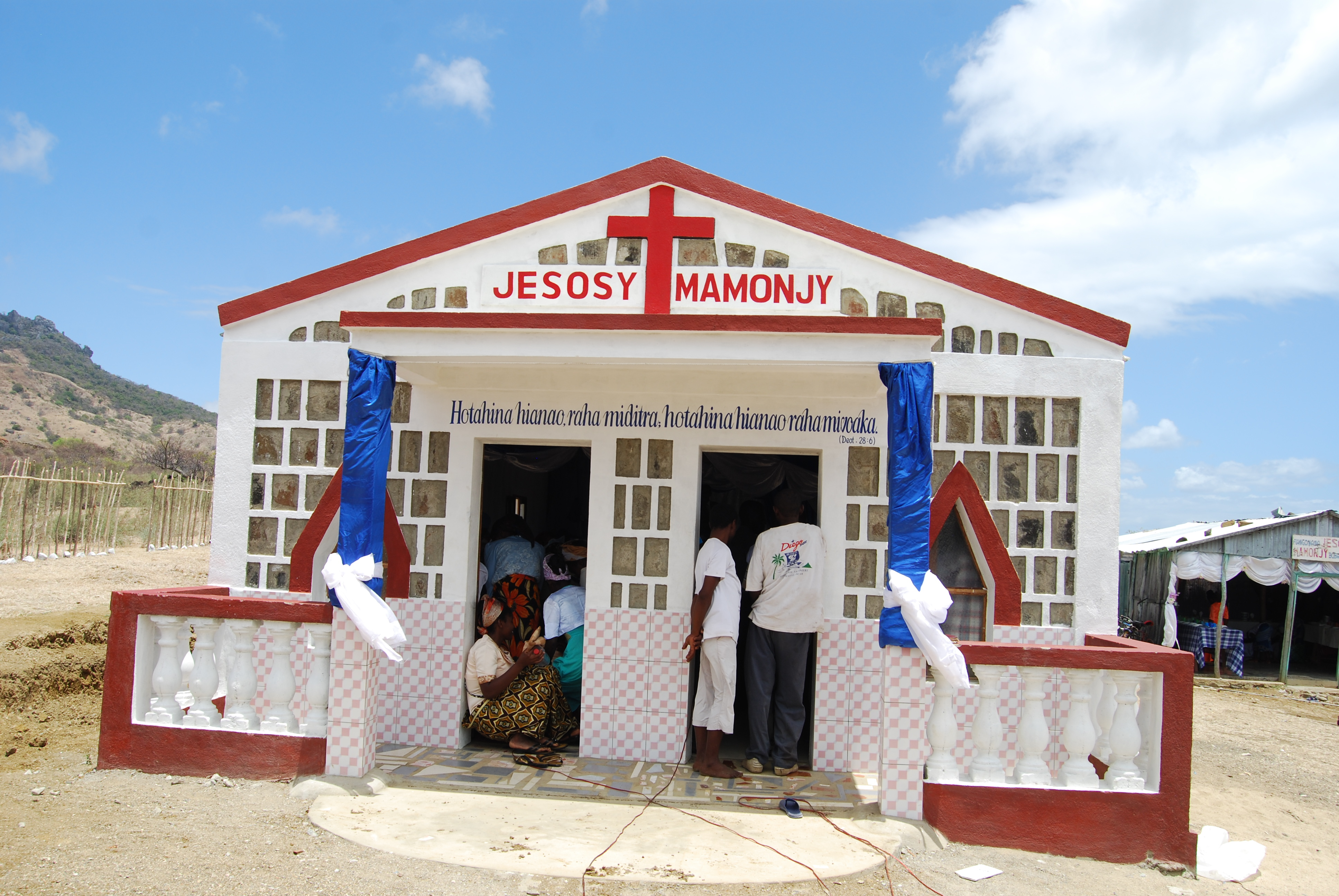
- the church of Bobaomby, a village of this municipality

- Location in Madagascar
- Coordinates: 12°3′17.2″S 49°13′57.3″E
- Country: Madagascar
- Region: Diana
- District: Antsiranana II
- Elevation: 62 m (203 ft)

Population (2001)
  - Total: 2,372
- Time zone: UTC+3 (EAT)
- Postal code: 202

Andranovondronina is a municipality in northern Madagascar, along with holding the status as most northern town on the island. It belongs to the district of Antsiranana II, which is a part of the Diana Region. According to the 2001 census the population of Andranovondronina was 2,372.

Only primary schooling is available in the town. Agriculture provides employment for 14% and 75% of the working population. The principal crop is maize, while other important products are cassava and rice. Services provide employment for 0.5% of the population. Additionally fishing employs 10.5% of the population.

== Cap Ambre ==
The northernmost point in Madagascar is situated in this municipality: the Cape Ambre or Tanjona Bobaomby. The creation of a national park is under way in this area.
