= Mahalina =

- Location in Madagascar
- Coordinates: 12°32′S 48°49′E
- Country: Madagascar
- Region: Diana
- District: Antsiranana II
- Elevation: 32 m (105 ft)

Population (2001)
  - Total: 2,217
- Time zone: UTC3 (EAT)

Mahalina is a municipality (French: commune, Malagasy: kaominina) in Madagascar. It belongs to the district of Antsiranana II, which is a part of Diana Region. According to 2001 census, the population of Mahalina was 2,217.

The majority 95% of the population are farmers. The most important crop is rice, while other important products are banana and coconut. Fishing employs the remaining 5% of the population.
