= Anketrakabe =

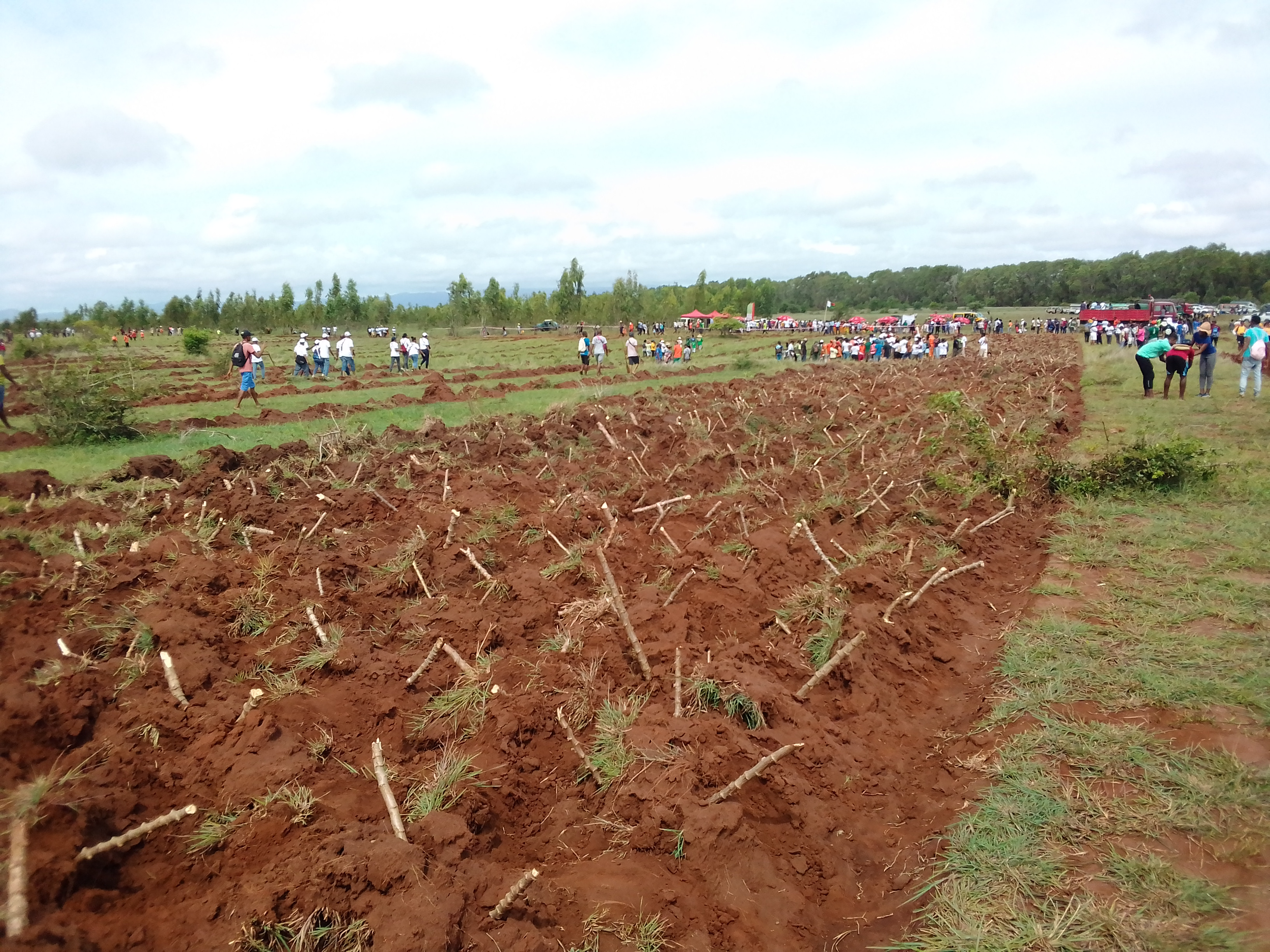
- planting trees in Aketrakabe

- Location in Madagascar
- Coordinates: 12°33′S 49°20′E
- Country: Madagascar
- Region: Diana
- District: Antsiranana II
- Elevation: 308 m (1,010 ft)

Population (2001)
  - Total: 2,933
- Time zone: UTC3 (EAT)

Anketrakabe is a town and commune (Malagasy: kaominina) in Madagascar. It belongs to the district of Antsiranana II, which is a part of Diana Region. According to 2001 commune census the population of Anketrakabe was 2,933.

Only primary schooling is available in town. The majority 60% of the population are farmers, while an additional 40% receives their livelihood from raising livestock. The most important crop is maize, while other important products are peanuts and rice.
