= Bobakilandy =

- Location in Madagascar
- Coordinates: 12°37′S 49°02′E
- Country: Madagascar
- Region: Diana
- District: Antsiranana II
- Elevation: 298 m (978 ft)
- Time zone: UTC3 (EAT)
- Postal code: 201

Bobakilandy is a rural municipality in Madagascar. It belongs to the district of Antsiranana II, which is a part of Diana Region.

It is situated next to the Montagne d'Ambre National Park.
