= Antsalaka =

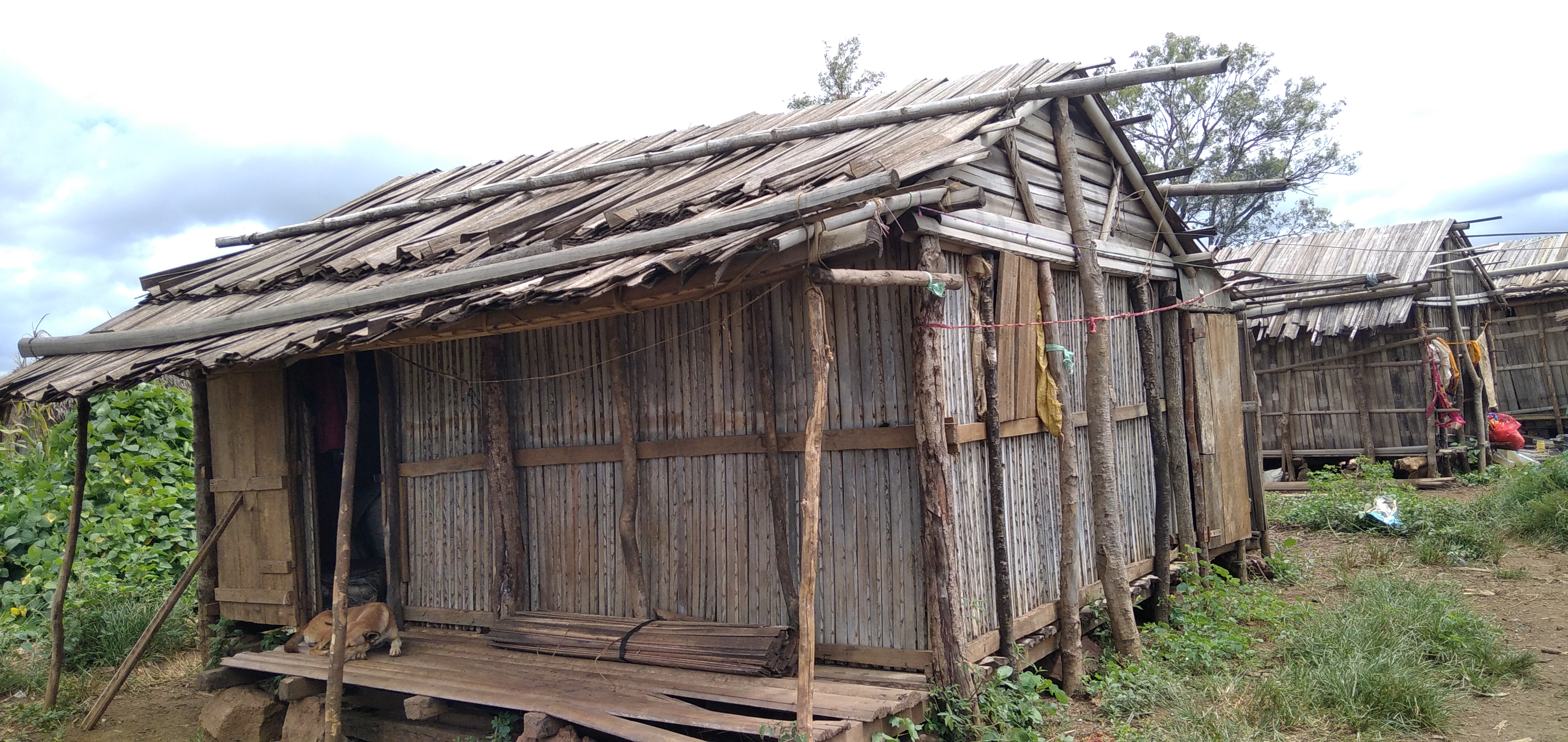
- Antsalaka

- Location in Madagascar
- Coordinates: 12°38′S 49°15′E
- Country: Madagascar
- Region: Diana
- District: Antsiranana II
- Elevation: 595 m (1,952 ft)

Population (2001)
  - Total: 4,000
- Time zone: UTC3 (EAT)

Antsalaka or Antsalaka Atsimo is a town and commune (Malagasy: kaominina) in northern Madagascar. It belongs to the district of Antsiranana II, which is a part of Diana Region. The population of the commune was estimated to be approximately 4,000 in 2001 commune census.

Only primary schooling is available. The majority 99.8% of the population of the commune are farmers. The most important crop is beans, while other important agricultural products are maize and rice. Services provide employment for 0.2% of the population.
