= Irodo River =

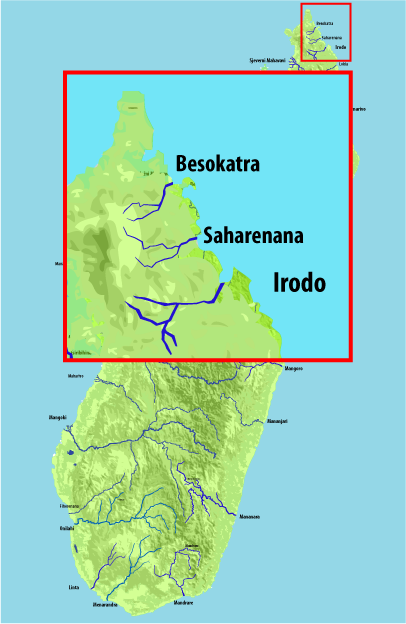
- Ambohitra Massif river system

Location
- Country: Madagascar
- Region: Diana - Sava
- City: Maromokotra

Physical characteristics
- Source
  - location: Ambohitra Massif, Diana
  - elevation: 1,100 m (3,600 ft)
- Mouth: Indian Ocean
  - location: Diana
  - coordinates: 12°48′40″S 49°39′40″E
  - elevation: 0 m (0 ft)

The Irodo River is located in northern Madagascar. Its sources are situated in the Ambohitra Massif and flows into the Indian Ocean. Near Sadjoavato it formed the Tsingy Rouge, a stone formation of red laterite formed by erosion.
