= Andranofanjava =

- Location in Madagascar
- Coordinates: 12°28′S 49°2′E
- Country: Madagascar
- Region: Diana
- District: Antsiranana II
- Elevation: 215 m (705 ft)

Population (2001)
  - Total: 4,413
- Time zone: UTC3 (EAT)

Andranofanjava is a municipality (French: commune, Malagasy: kaominina) in Madagascar. It belongs to the district of Antsiranana II, which is a part of Diana Region. According to 2001 census the population of Andranofanjava was 4,413.

Only primary schooling is available in town. The majority 99.5% of the population are farmers. The most important crops are rice and maize. Services provide employment for 0.5% of the population.
