= Mosorolava =

- Location in Madagascar
- Coordinates: 12°44′S 48°58′E
- Country: Madagascar
- Region: Diana
- District: Antsiranana II
- Elevation: 38 m (125 ft)

Population (2001)
  - Total: 7,362
- Time zone: UTC3 (EAT)

Mosorolava or Misorolava is a municipality (French: commune, Malagasy: kaominina) in Madagascar. It belongs to the district of Antsiranana II, which is a part of Diana Region. According to 2001 census the population of Mosorolava was 7,362.

Only primary schooling is available in town. The majority 98% of the population are farmers. The most important crop is rice, while other important products are banana and maize. Services provide employment for 1% of the population. Additionally fishing employs 1% of the population.
