= Bobasakoa =

- Location in Madagascar
- Coordinates: 12°48′S 48°57′E
- Country: Madagascar
- Region: Diana
- District: Antsiranana II
- Elevation: 10 m (33 ft)

Population (2001)
  - Total: 6,309
- Time zone: UTC3 (EAT)
- Postal code: 202

Bobasakoa is a municipality (French: commune, Malagasy: kaominina) in Madagascar. It belongs to the district of Antsiranana II, which is a part of Diana Region. According to 2001 census the population of Bobasakoa was 6,309.

Only primary schooling is available in town. The majority 98.9% of the population are farmers, and the most important crop is rice. Services provide employment for 0.1% of the population, while fishing employs 1% of the population.

Postal code 202.
