= Sadjoavato =

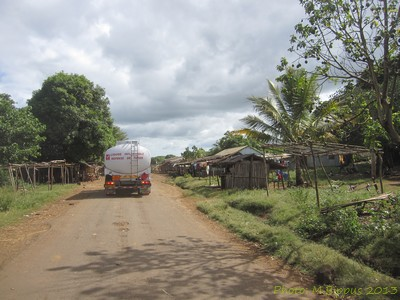

- Location in Madagascar
- Coordinates: 12°37′S 49°21′E
- Country: Madagascar
- Region: Diana
- District: Antsiranana II
- Elevation: 249 m (817 ft)

Population (2009)
  - Total: 6,705
- Time zone: UTC3 (EAT)

Sadjoavato is a town and commune (Malagasy: kaominina) in Madagascar. It belongs to the district of Antsiranana II in the Diana Region.

It is situated between Antsiranana and Ambilombe on the National Road No.6 at a distance of approx. 51 km from Antsiranana

Its name means "Stonejug" (Sadjoa = jug; vato = stone) and is derived from a legend of the presence of an invisible jug made from natural stone that is only visible if one makes it to throw a coin or a stone inside.

According to 2009 commune census the population of Sadjoavato was 6,705.

Only primary schooling is available in town. The town provides access to hospital services to its citizens. The majority 98% of the population are farmers, while an additional 1.5% receives their livelihood from raising livestock. The most important crop is maize, while other important products are cassava and rice. Services provide employment for 0.5% of the population.

== Visitor attractions ==
The Tsingy Rouge are situated near this town.

== Roads ==
This town is traversed by the National Road No.6

== See also ==
- Antanandrenitelo
