= Antsiranana II District =

Antsiranana II Diego II
- District
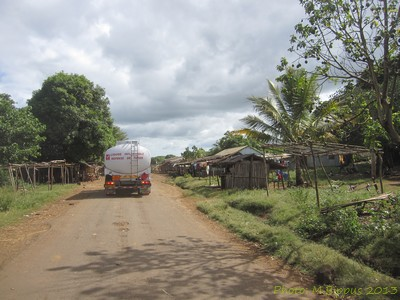
- The RN6 crossing Sadjoavato

- Location within Madagascar
- Coordinates: 12°27′39″S 49°14′22″E
- Country: Madagascar
- Region: Diana Region

Population (2018)
  - Total: 133,027
- Postal code: 202

Antsiranana II (or: Diego II) is a district of the Diana region in Madagascar.

It covers the rural municipalities around the city of Antsiranana, better known as Diego Suarez, or simply called Diego.

== Roads ==
This district is crossed by the National road 6 to Ambilobe and the National road 59b (Antsiranana - Ramena).

== Municipalities ==
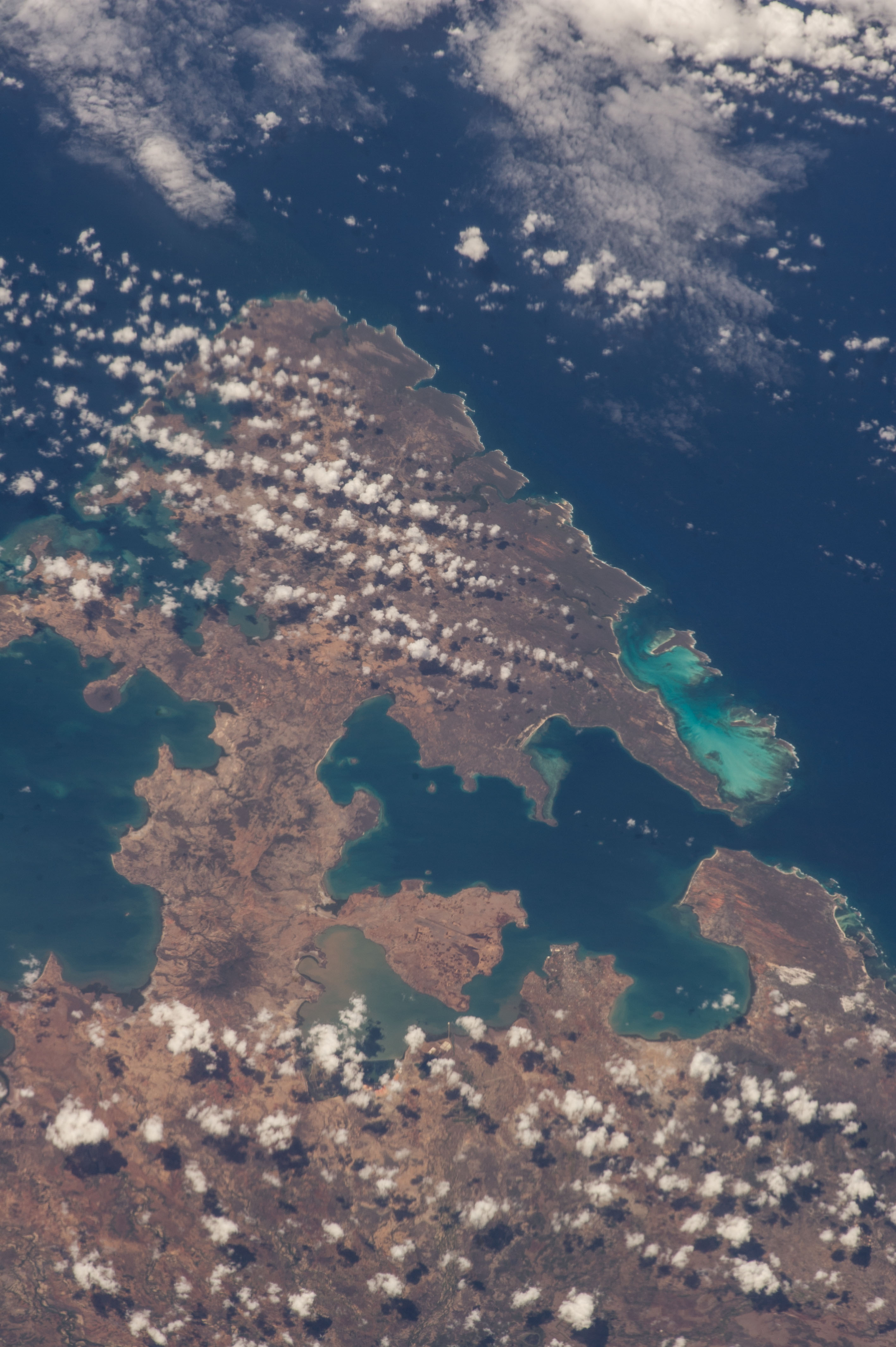
Aerial view of the district

The total population of the district of Antsiranana II (Diego II) is 133,027 inhabitants that live in the following 21 municipalities:

- Ambolobozobe - 3,412 inhabitants
- Ambondrona - 4,267 inhabitants
- Andranofanjava - 4,393 inhabitants
- Andrafiabe - 4,042 inhabitants
- Andranovondronina - 2,950 inhabitants
- Ankarongana - 5,763 inhabitants
- Anketrakabe - 6,322 inhabitants
- Anivorano Nord - 24,901 inhabitants
- Antanamitarana - 6,271 inhabitants
- Antsakoabe - 2,232 inhabitants
- Antsalaka - 5,066 inhabitants
- Antsoha - 6,290 inhabitants
- Bobasakoa - 3,483 inhabitants
- Bobakilandy - 3,218 inhabitants
- Joffreville - 3,276 inhabitants
- Mahalina - 2,196 inhabitants
- Mahavanona - 14,235 inhabitants
- Mangaoka - 5,279 inhabitants
- Mosorolava - 6,554 inhabitants
- Sadjoavato - 5,994 inhabitants
- Sakaramy - 4,257 inhabitants
- Ramena - 3,527 inhabitants

Total of 133,027 inhabitants for the district of Antsiranana II (Diego II).
