= Anivorano Nord =

Anivorano Nord Anivorano Avaratra
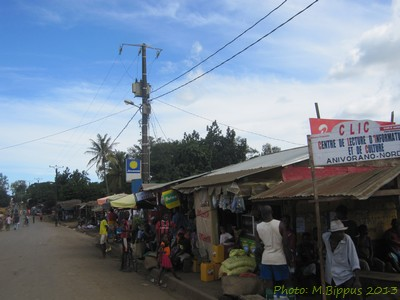
- Anivorano-Nord

- Location in Madagascar
- Coordinates: 12°44′S 49°14′E
- Country: Madagascar
- Region: Diana
- District: Antsiranana II
- Elevation: 440 m (1,440 ft)

Population (2018)Census
  - Total: 24,838
- Time zone: UTC3 (EAT)
- Postal code: 202

Anivorano Nord or Anivorano Avaratra is a municipality in Madagascar. It belongs to the district of Antsiranana II, which is a part of Diana Region.

Primary and junior level secondary education are available in town. It is also a site of industrial-scale mining. The majority 99% of the population are farmers. The most important crop is rice, while other important products are peanut and maize. Services provide employment for 1% of the population.

== Geography ==
Anivorano Nord is situated at the Route nationale 6 at 69 km from Diego Suarez. Next towns are Ambilobe and Andrafiabe.

== Bodies of water ==
The Antanavo Lake & the Beamalona River are situated in this municipality.

== Gallery ==
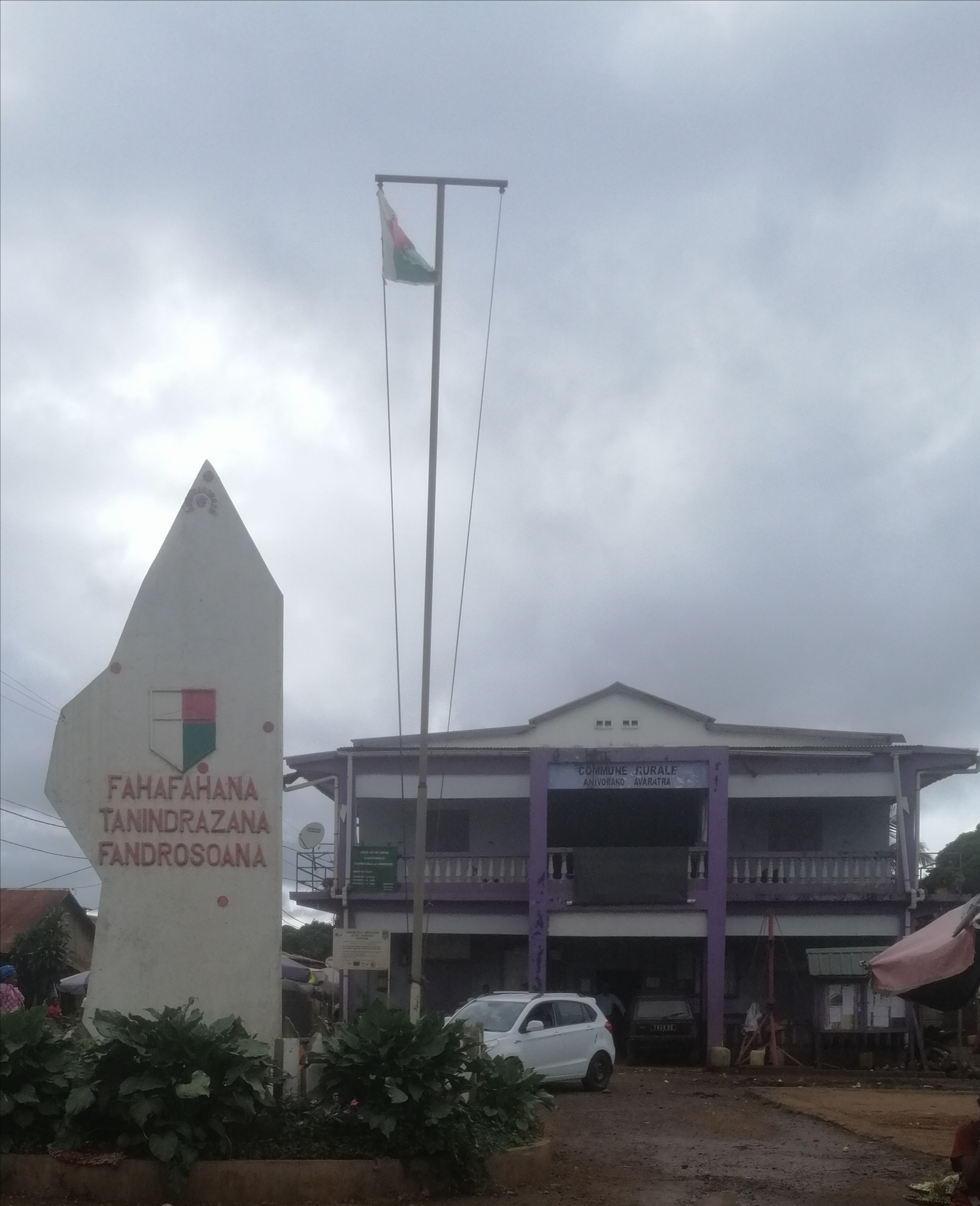
The town hall

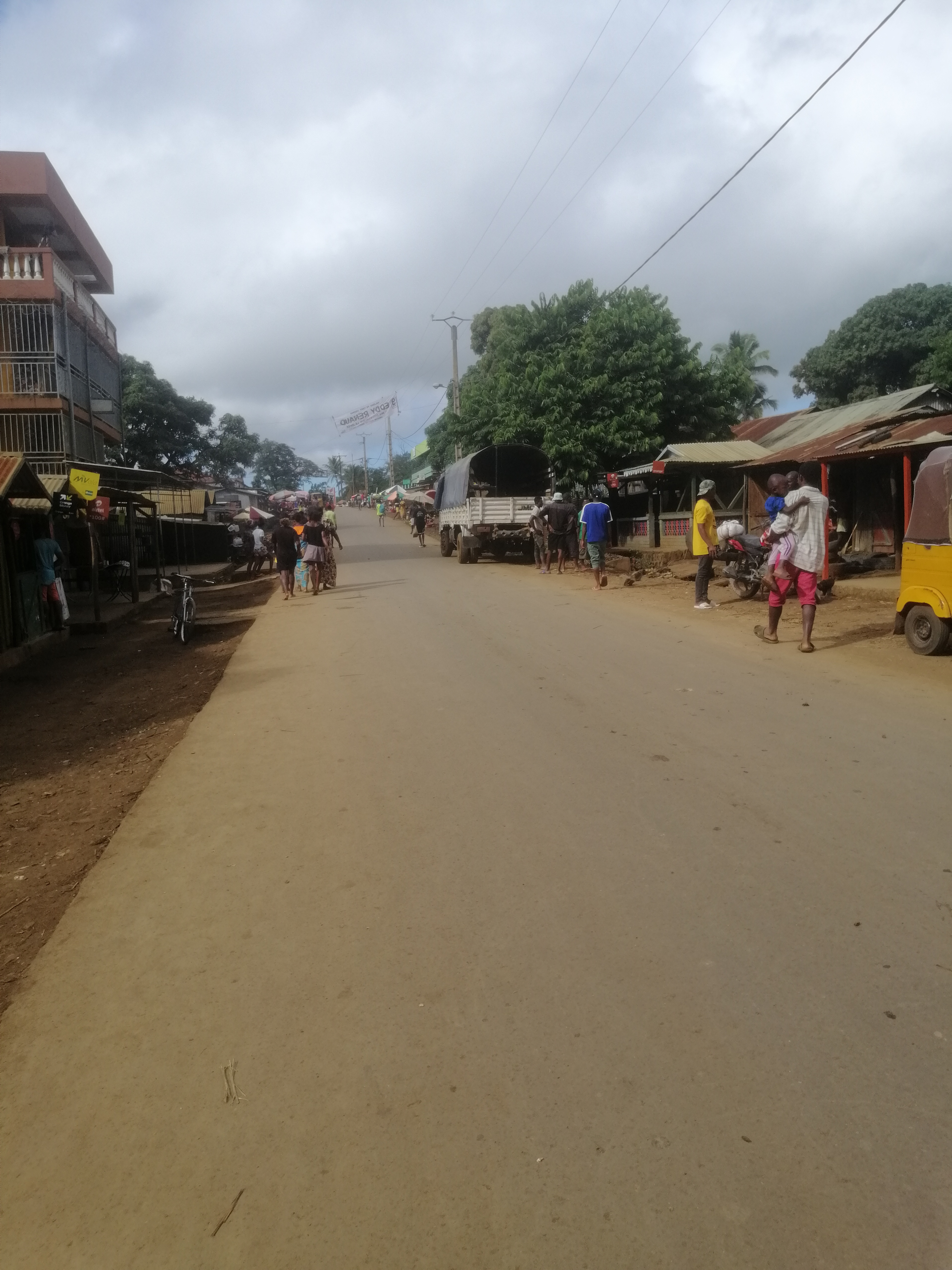
National road 6

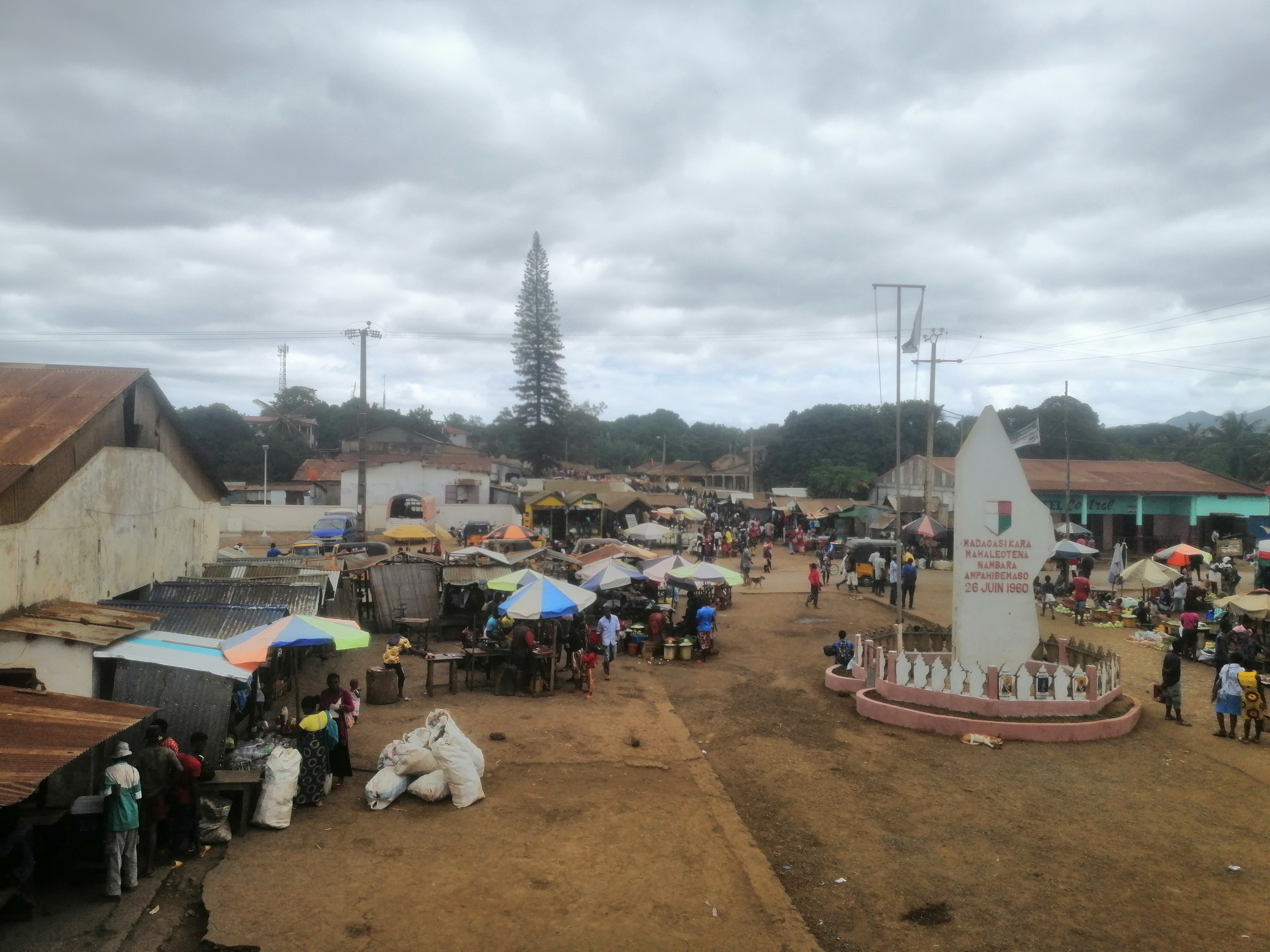
The market

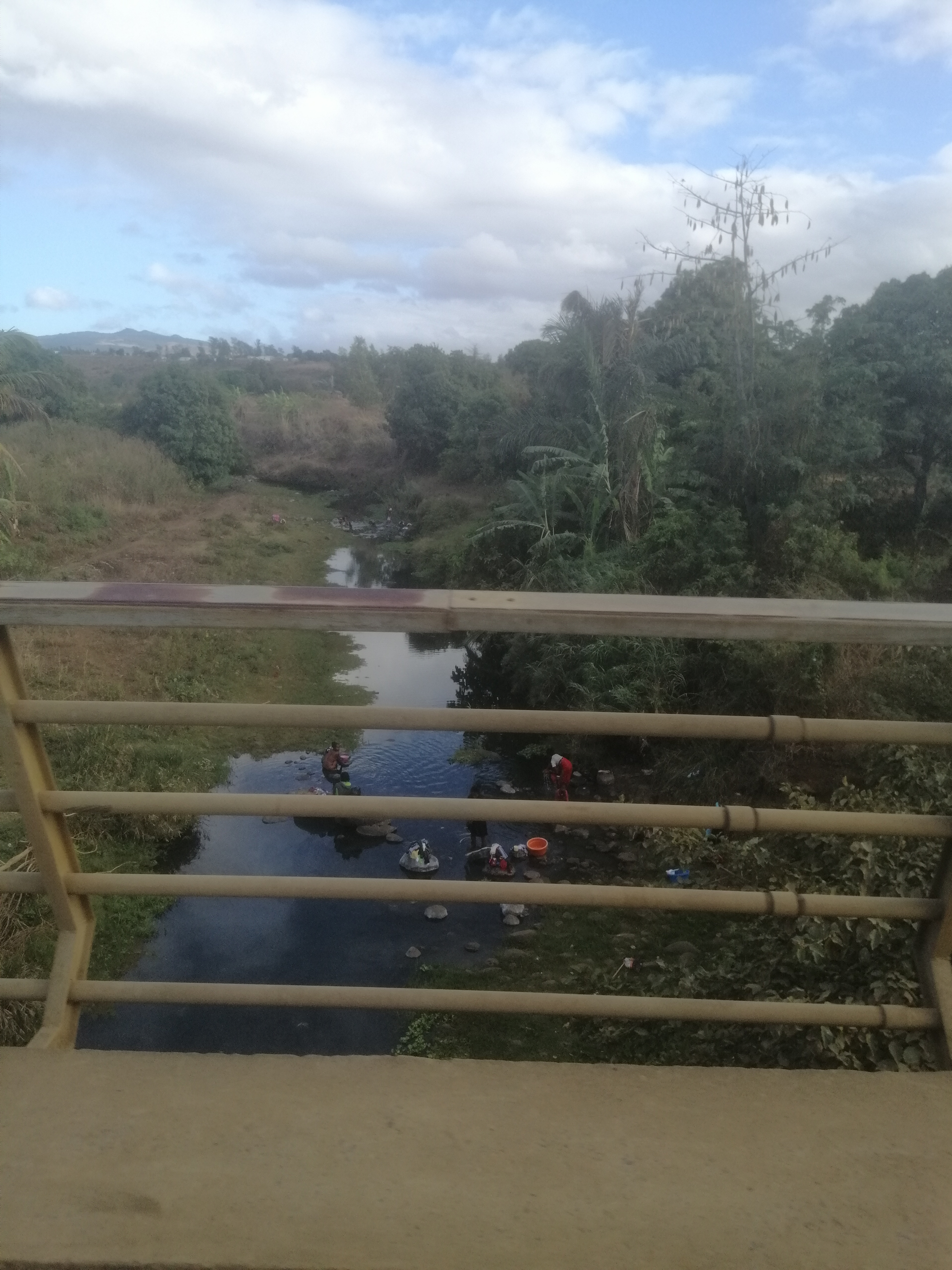
Beamalona River
