= Tsingy Rouge =

Stone formation in northern Madagascar

Coordinates: 12°38′20″S 49°29′50″E

Tsingy Rouge Red Tsingy
- Laterite formations / Erosion landform
- Interactive map of Tsingy Rouge
- Location: Diana Region, Madagascar
- Formed by: Erosion of the Irodo River

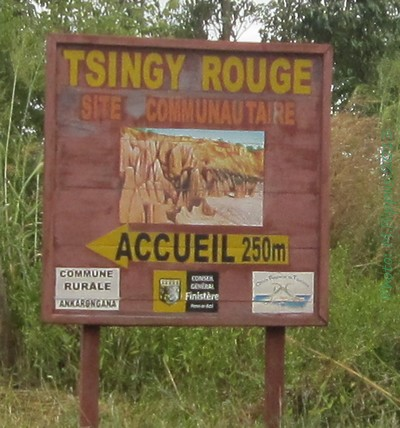
Tsingy Rouge-Ankarangona

The Tsingy Rouge (Red Tsingy) is a stone formation of red laterite formed by erosion of the Irodo River in the Diana Region in northern Madagascar. The name "Tsingy" comes from a Malagasy word meaning "where one cannot walk barefoot." The formations were revealed in the 1950s after landslides exposed them, and the iron oxide-rich soil gives the landscape its reddish-orange color.

It is situated approximately 60 km south of Antsiranana near the town of Sadjoavato.
