= Joffreville =

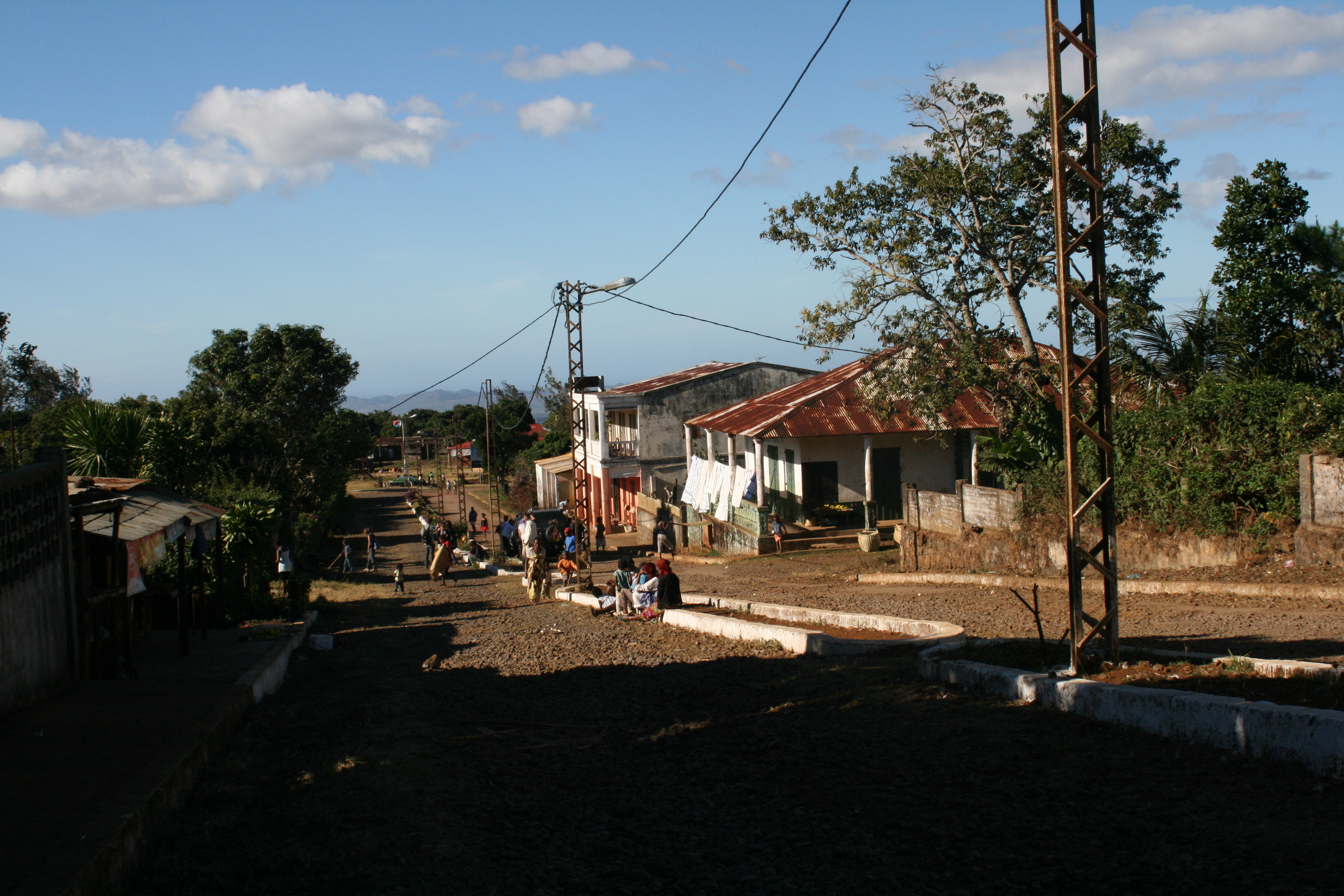

- Location in Madagascar
- Coordinates: 12°29′S 49°12′E
- Country: Madagascar
- Region: Diana
- District: Antsiranana II
- Elevation: 634 m (2,080 ft)

Population (2009)
  - Total: 3,532
- Time zone: UTC3 (EAT)

Joffreville or Ambohitra is a town and commune (Malagasy: kaominina) in Madagascar. It belongs to the district of Antsiranana II, which is a part of Diana Region. According to 2009 commune census the population of Joffreville was 3532.

Joffreville is served by a local airport. Primary and junior level secondary education are available in town. The majority 90% of the population are farmers, while an additional 8% receives their livelihood from raising livestock. The most important crops are lychee and vegetables; also banana is an important agricultural product. Industry and services provide both employment for 1% of the population.

== References and notes ==
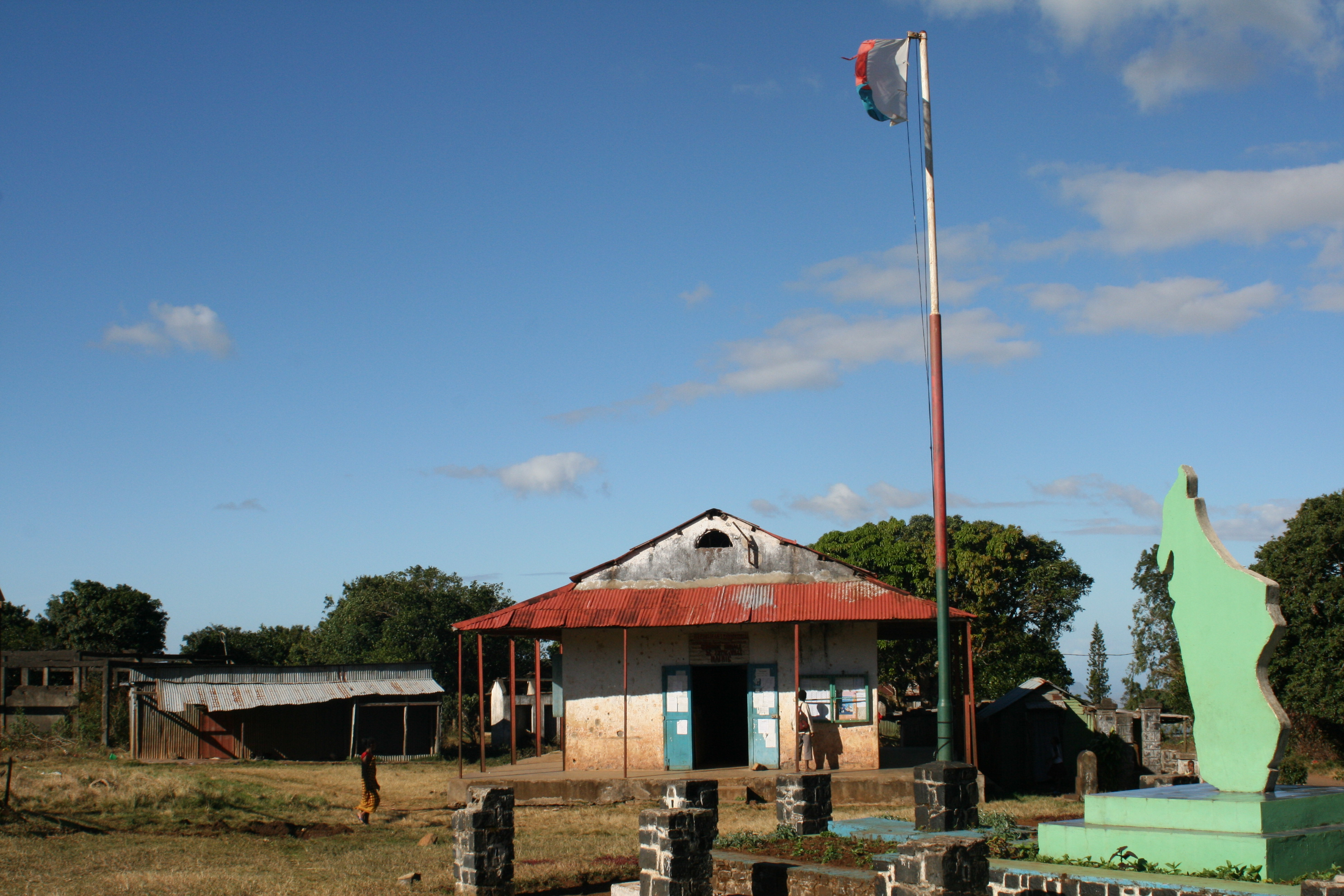
Town hall

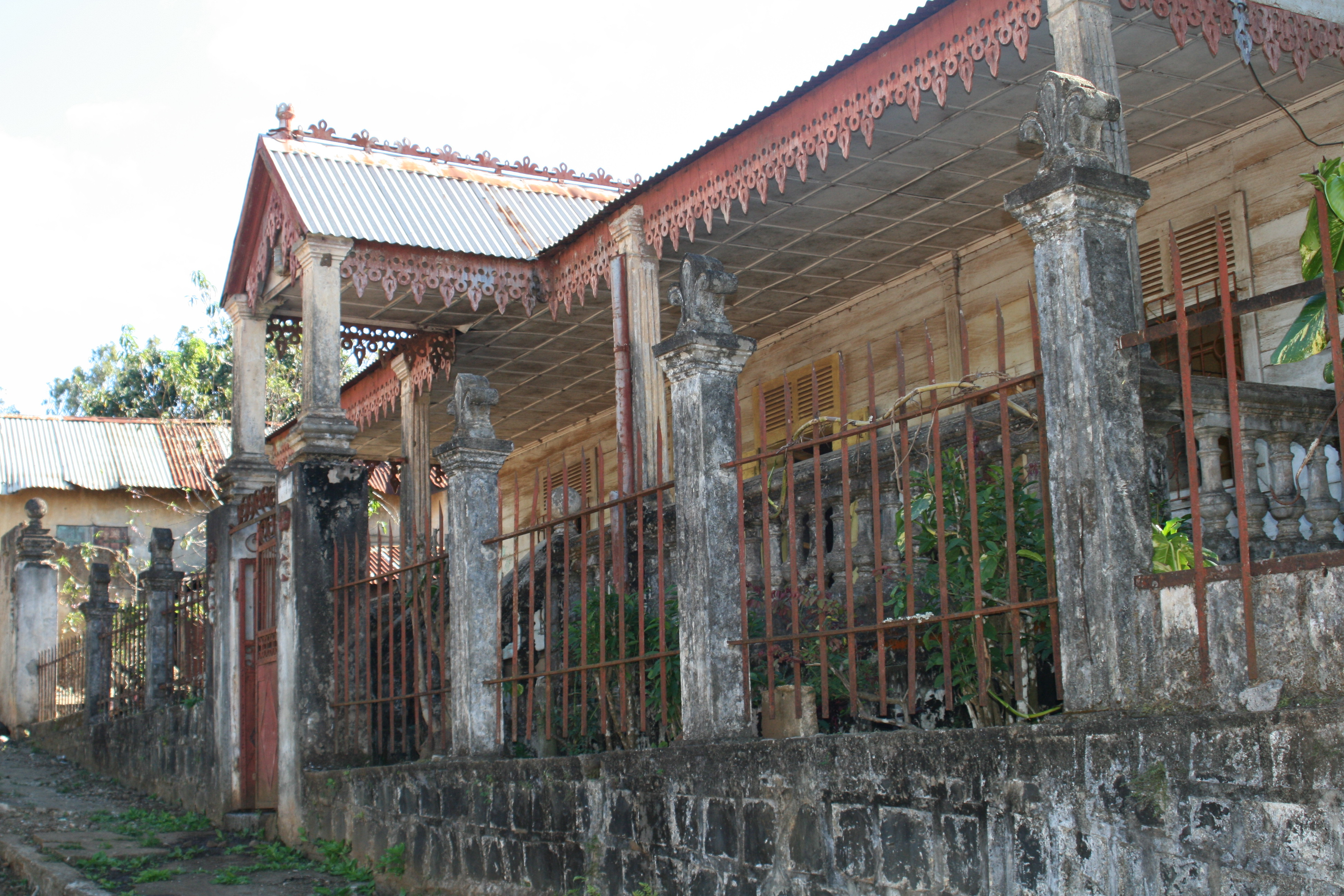
Colonial house
