= Route nationale 6 (Madagascar) =

Road in Madagascar

Location
- Country: Madagascar

Highway system
- Roads in Madagascar

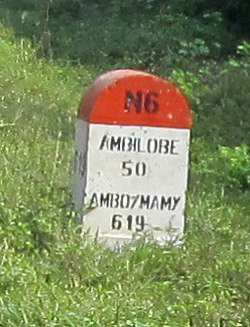
Route Nationale 6

Route nationale 6 (RN6) is a primary highway in Madagascar of 706 km, running from Antsiranana to Ambondromamy. It crosses the regions of Diana and Sofia. It was paved in 1992.

Most parts of this road are paved and well maintained but there are some unpaved sections in a very bad shape.

== Selected locations on route (from north to south) ==
- Antsiranana
- Tsingy Rouge
- Anivorano Nord
- Ambondromifehy
- Ankarana Reserve (Tsingy d'Ankarana) - at Mahamasina
- Ambilobe - (junction with RN5a to Vohémar and Sambava)
- Ambanja - (Manongarivo Reserve at 35 km from Ambanja).
- Mahamanina Falls
- Maromandia
- Antsohihy (junction with RN 31 to Bealanana) and RN 32 to Mandritsara)
- bridge over the Sofia River.
- Port Berge (Boriziny)
- Mampikony
- Ambondromamy- (junction with RN4 (Mahajanga - Antananarivo)

== Gallery ==
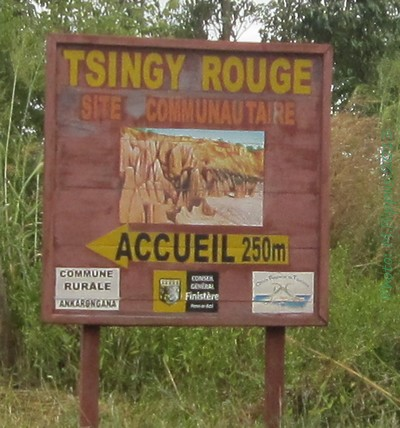
Tsingy Rouge

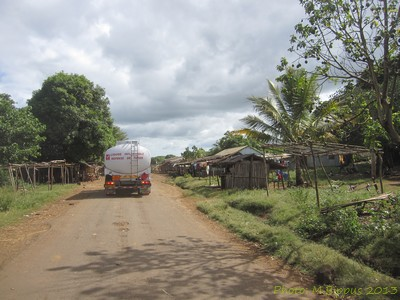
RN6 at Sadjoavato

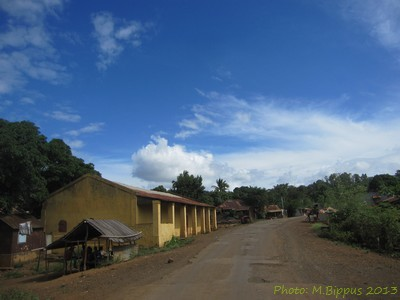
RN6 at Antsakoabe

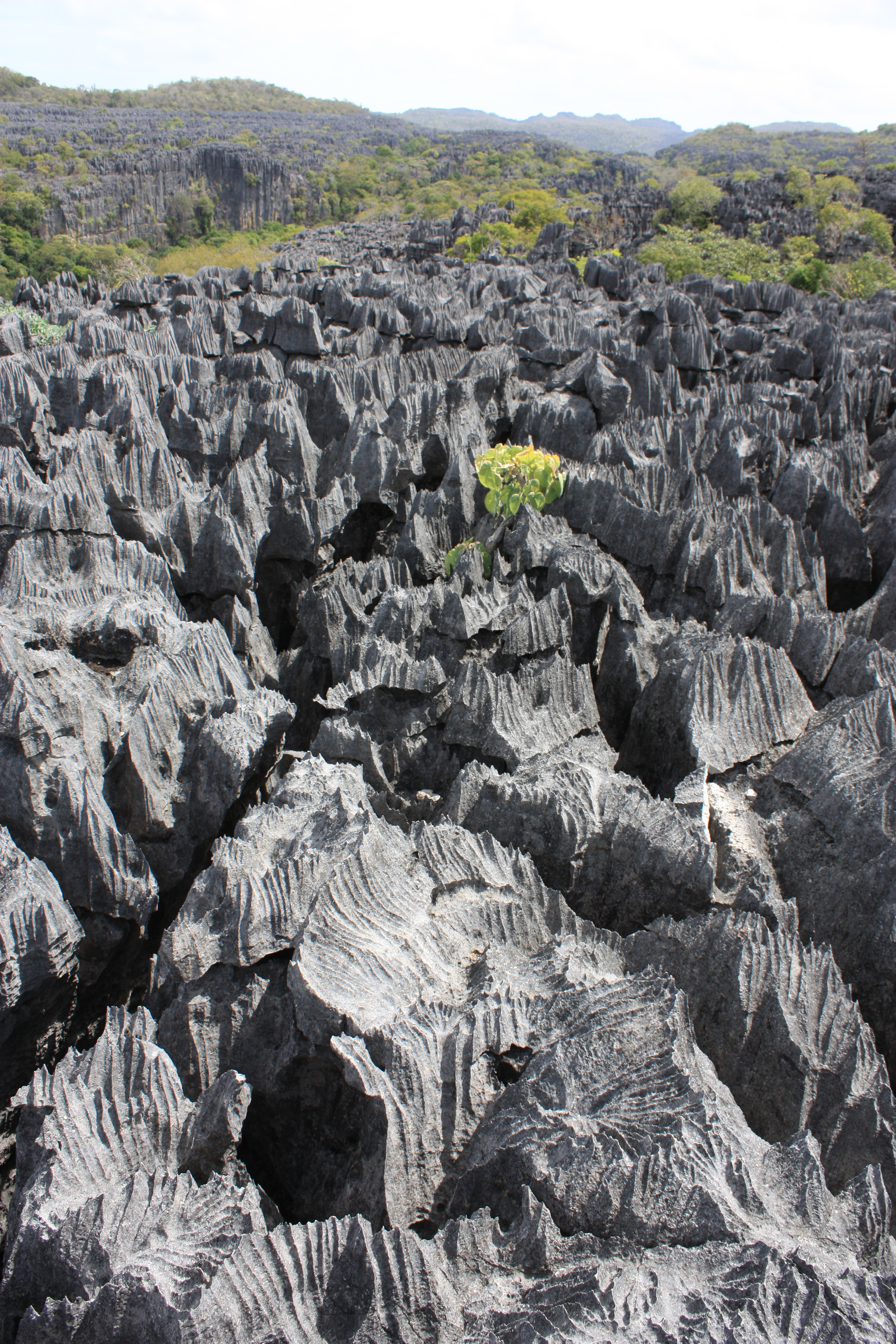
Tsingy d'Ankarana

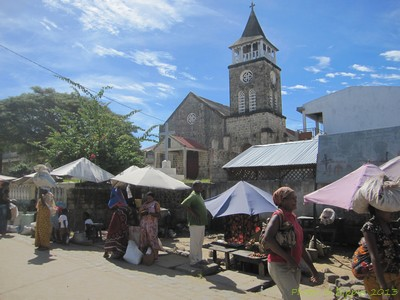
Ambilobe

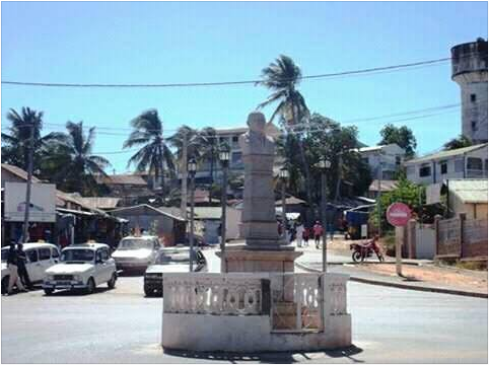
Rond point d'Antsohihy

== See also ==
- List of roads in Madagascar
- Transport in Madagascar
