= Antsiranana =

City in Diana, Madagascar

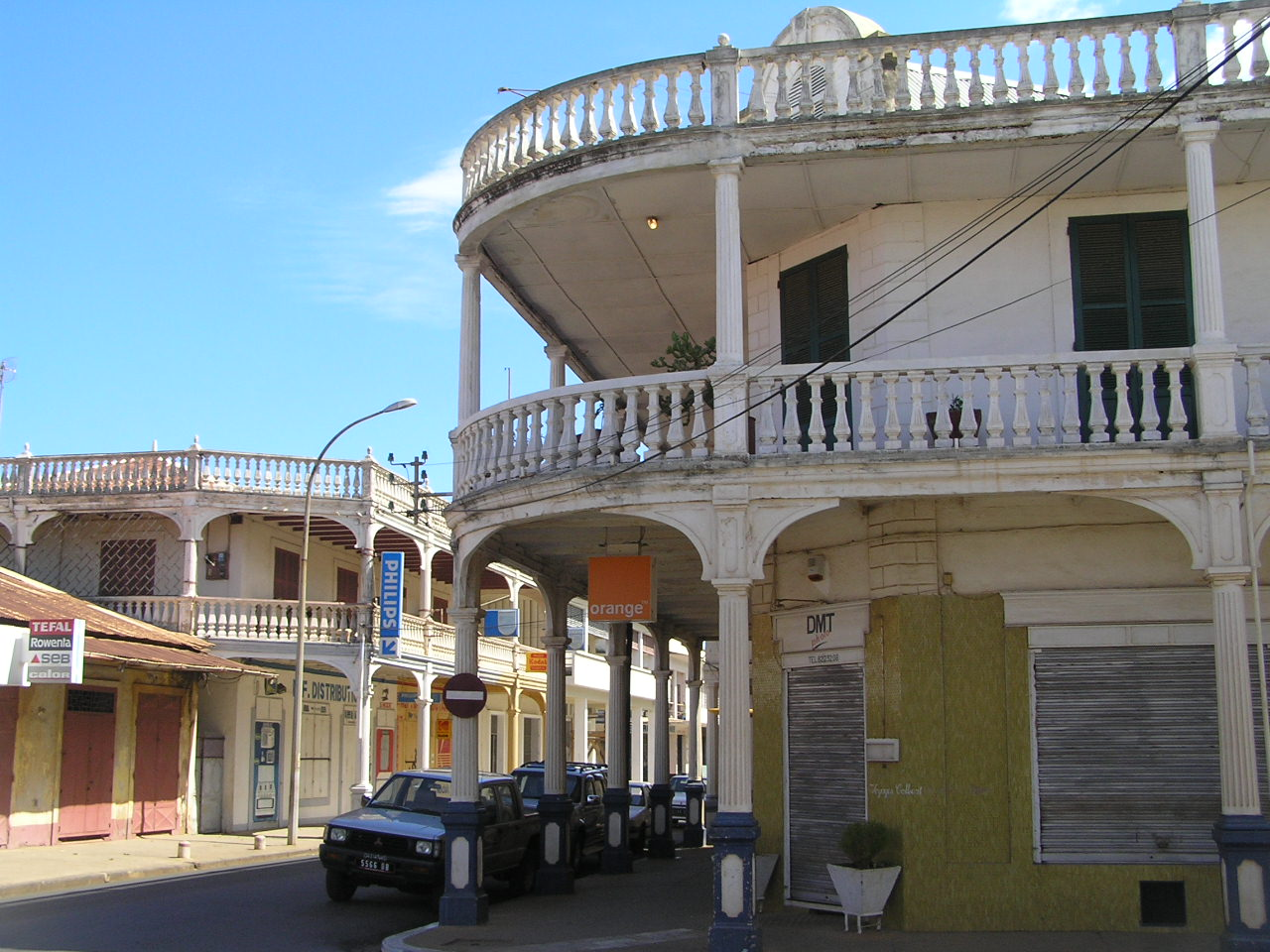
- Antsiranana

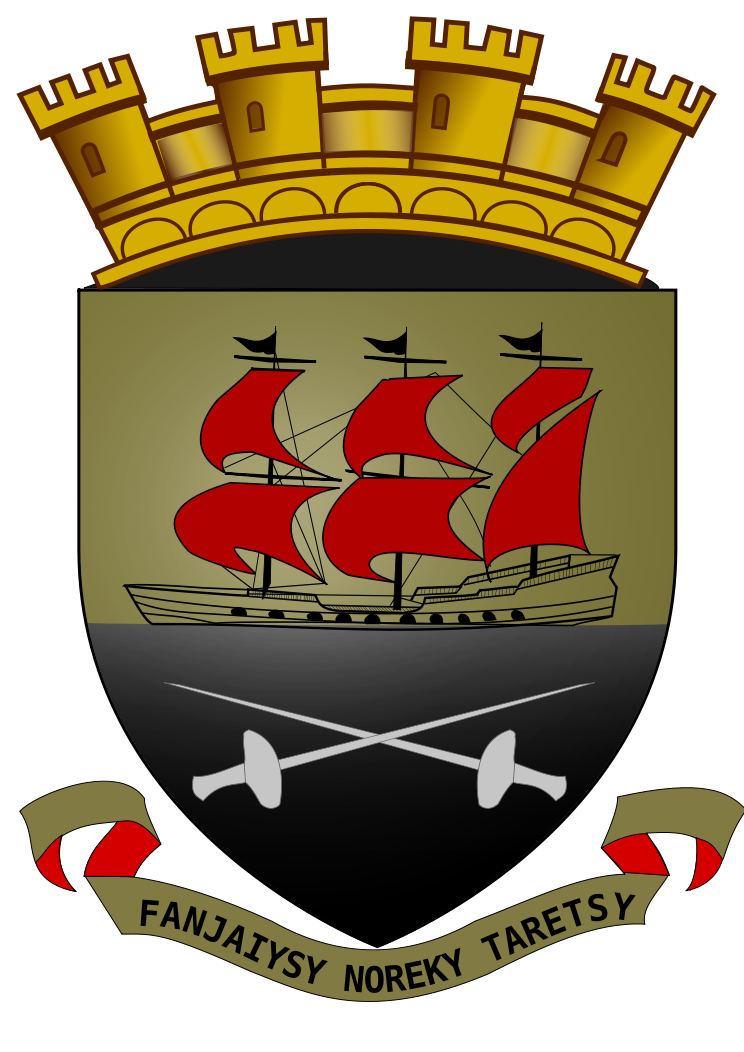
- Coat of arms
- Nickname: Diego Suarez
- Interactive map of Antsiranana
- Location of Antsiranana in Madagascar
- Coordinates: 12°18′S 49°17′E
- Country: Madagascar
- Region: Diana Region

Area
  - Total: 71.9 km^{2} (27.8 sq mi)

Population (2018 census)
  - Total: 129,320
  - Density: 1,800/km^{2} (4,660/sq mi)
- Postal code: 201
- Climate: Aw

Antsiranana (Malagasy: Antsiranana Malagasy pronunciation: [antsʲˈraŋanə̥]), named Diego-Suarez prior to 1975, is a city in the far north of Madagascar. Antsiranana is the capital of Diana Region. It had an estimated population of 115,015 in 2013.

== History ==
At the beginning of the 16th century, a Portuguese squadron of 13 ships crisscrossed the Indian Ocean. One of these ships went adrift, and its captain, Diogo Dias, was therefore the first European to discover the island on August 10, 1500, which he named Isle of Saint Lawrence. In February 1506, Admiral Fernão Soares recognized the place and so Antomabokala, former capital of Ankarana, acquired its name of Diego Suarez (Diogo Soares, in Portuguese), which comes from the junction of the first name of the captain and the surname of the Admiral. In 1635, the bay was mentioned for the first time under this name by the French pilot Berthelot, author of an oriental map of Africa and Madagascar. In 1824, the bay was explored by the English hydrographer Owen, then in 1833, Captain Bigeault, commandant of La Nièvre, traveled the North East coast to carry out hydrographic surveys.

In the 1880s, the bay was coveted by France, which desired it as a coaling station for steamships. After the first Franco-Hova War, Queen Ranavalona III signed a treaty on December 17, 1885, granting France a protectorate over the bay and surrounding territory, as well as the islands of Nossi-Bé and Ste. Marie de Madagascar.

The French took possession of their new colony and the Bay of Diego Suarez (also called Bay of Antomboko at that time). It was then called Etablissement français de Diego-Suarez (French Establishment of Diego-Suarez) and was placed under the command of Frigate captain Caillet who is the founder of the city of Diego Suarez.

The first barracks were built at Cap Diego. The first habitants of the new colony were Creoles from Réunion and Mauritius, as well as from the French possession of Toamasina, Nosy Be, Ile Sainte-Marie, Mayotte and Mahajanga.

Run away slaves (Makoas), Antankarana and Sakalava made up another big part of the population. In 1886, the colony had a population of 2500 habitants.

In 1887, a civil governor, Froger, replaced Caillet. In 1888, Nossi-Bé and Sainte Marie de Madagascar were attached to the colony.

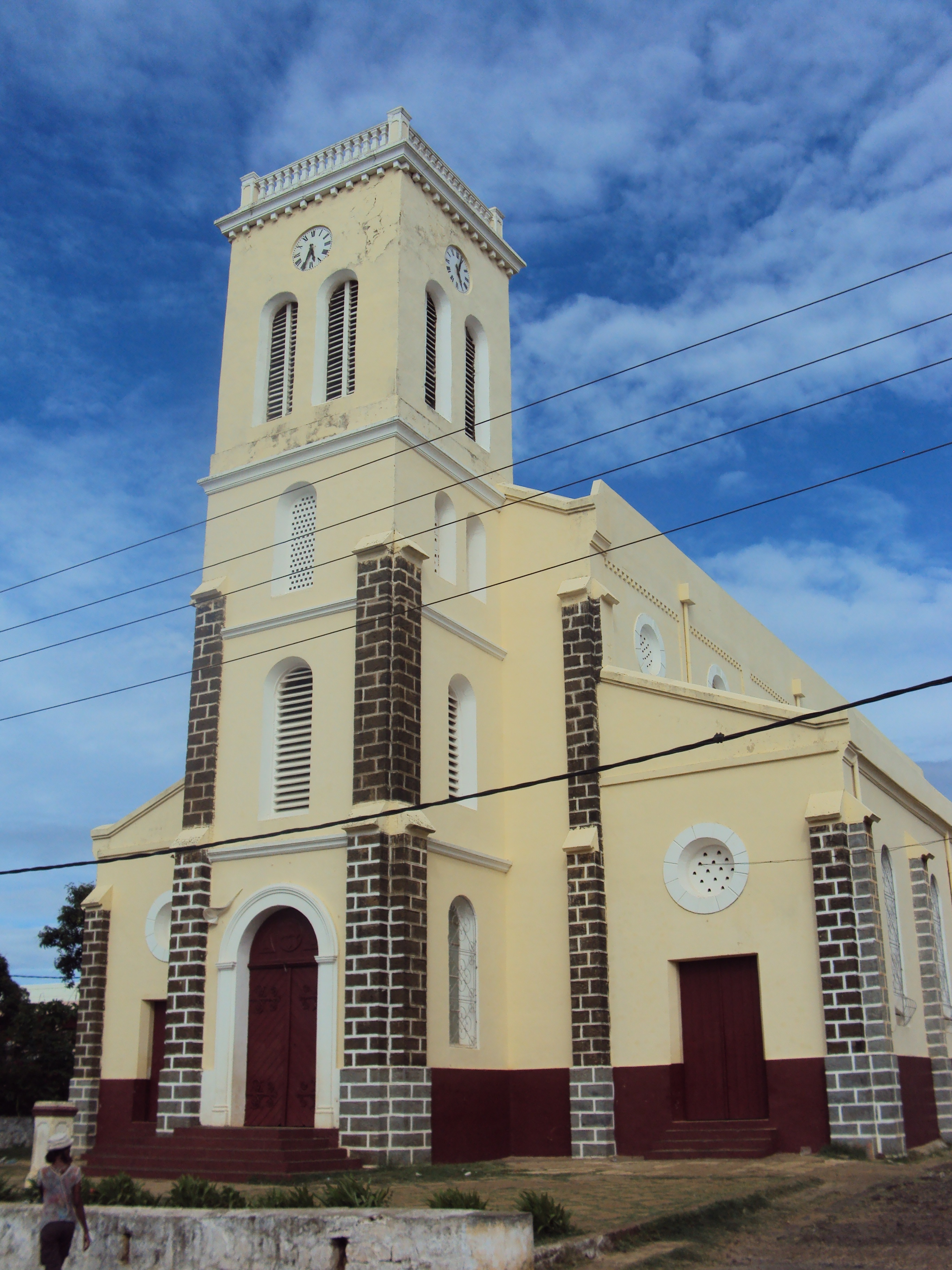
Cathedral of Antsiranana

In 1900, the Decauville railway at Diégo Suarez was built. The Second Pacific Squadron of Imperial Russia anchored and was resupplied at Diego-Suarez on its way to the Battle of Tsushima in 1905.

On 21 March 1909, the first bricks of the cathedral were laid down. In 1919 there was an epidemics of the Spanish flu followed by an outbreak of the plague in 1920. Still, in 1925 the Province de Diego-Suarez had 13695 habitants.

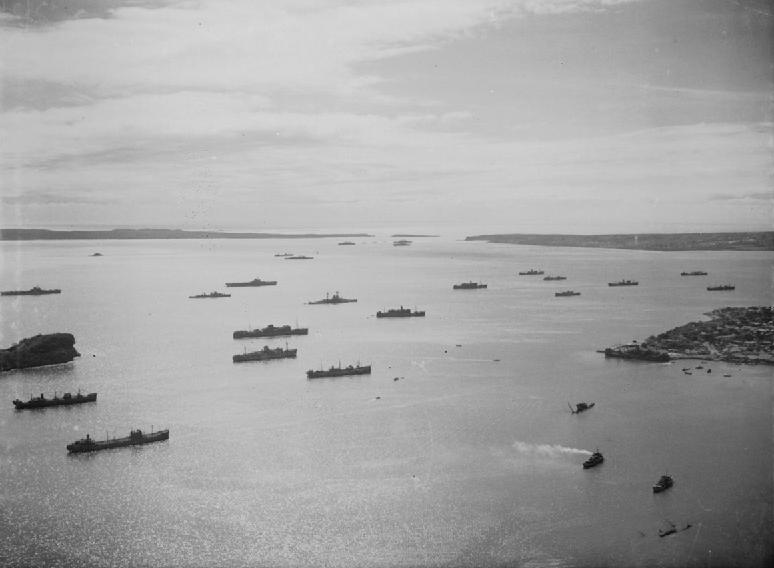
Warships and British merchant ships in the Antsiranana harbour after the French had surrendered on 13 May 1942.

In 1942, Diego-Suarez was the primary objective of Operation Ironclad, the starting point of the Allied invasion and capture of Madagascar. The Allies were concerned that Japan would pressure Vichy France into granting use of Madagascar, as they had with French Indo-China during the previous year, and determined that the island should not be made a base for the interception of Allied shipping. Diego-Suarez, with its superb harbour and a concentration of government officials, was selected as the initial invasion point. The Japanese responded with an attack by midget submarines on the British naval forces in the harbour, damaging the battleship HMS Ramillies and sinking the oil tanker British Loyalty.

France continued to operate a military base in the city following Malagasy independence in 1960. Between 1973 and 1975, French forces were withdrawn.

== Education ==
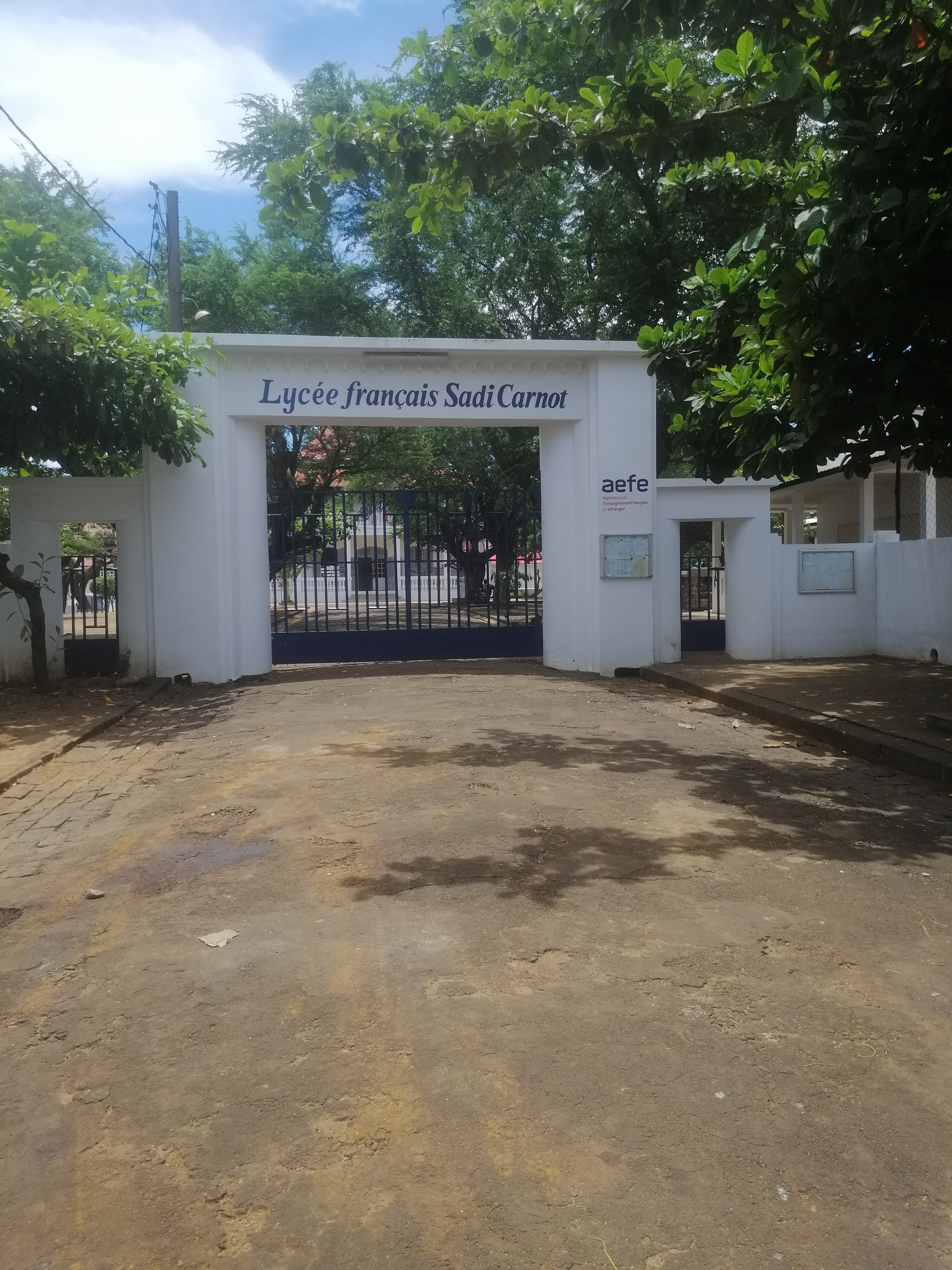
Lycée Français Sadi-Carnot

The University of Antsiranana was founded in 1976.

Lycée Français Diego Suarez, or Lycée Français Sadi-Carnot, is a French international school in Antsiranana. Historically it was the Collège français Sadi Carnot.

== Transport ==
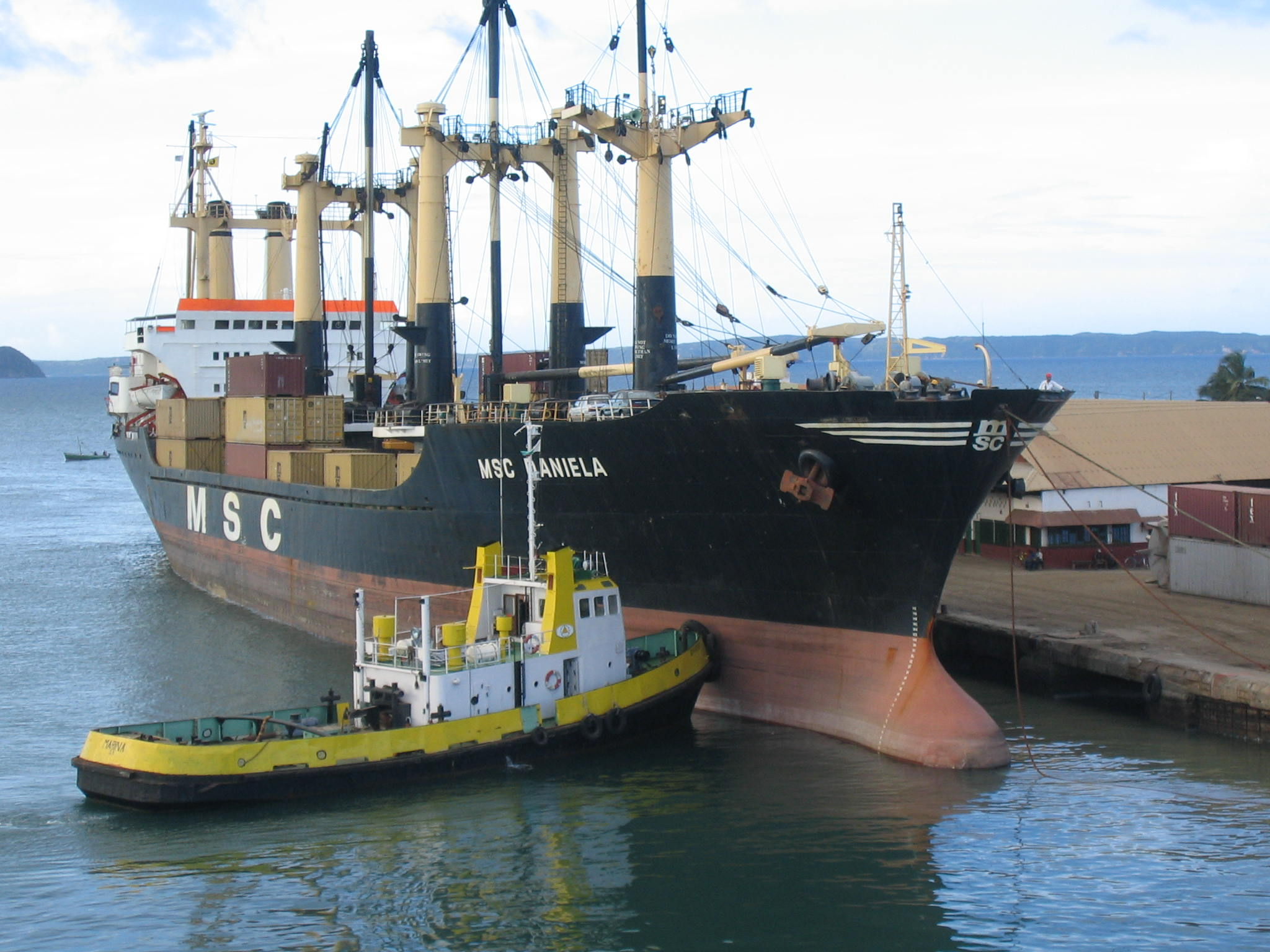
Container ship in Antsiranana harbour

Antsiranana is situated on Antsiranana Bay, one of the largest deep-water harbours in the Indian Ocean, but the remote location, and, until recently, a bad road to the south, rendered it unimportant for freight traffic. There is a cruise port with periodic visits.

Arrachart Airport provides communication primarily with other parts of Madagascar.

== Geography ==
=== Climate ===
Antsiranana has a tropical savannah climate (Aw) with long, hot summer-like weather that lasts year round cut into two seasons; a wet season which lasts from December to March and a dry season which lasts the rest of the year with rainfall being uncommon but not impossible.

Climate data for Antsiranana (1991–2020, extremes 1941–present)
Month	Jan	Feb	Mar	Apr	May	Jun	Jul	Aug	Sep	Oct	Nov	Dec	Year
Record high °C (°F)	36.6 (97.9)	34.6 (94.3)	34.8 (94.6)	35.0 (95.0)	33.6 (92.5)	33.0 (91.4)	33.0 (91.4)	33.0 (91.4)	33.5 (92.3)	37.0 (98.6)	38.0 (100.4)	39.0 (102.2)	39.0 (102.2)
Mean daily maximum °C (°F)	31.1 (88.0)	30.7 (87.3)	31.1 (88.0)	31.6 (88.9)	31.0 (87.8)	29.7 (85.5)	29.2 (84.6)	29.4 (84.9)	30.1 (86.2)	31.1 (88.0)	32.1 (89.8)	32.1 (89.8)	30.8 (87.4)
Daily mean °C (°F)	27.1 (80.8)	26.8 (80.2)	27.1 (80.8)	27.1 (80.8)	26.4 (79.5)	25.0 (77.0)	24.4 (75.9)	24.6 (76.3)	25.2 (77.4)	26.2 (79.2)	27.3 (81.1)	27.6 (81.7)	26.2 (79.2)
Mean daily minimum °C (°F)	23.0 (73.4)	23.0 (73.4)	23.0 (73.4)	22.7 (72.9)	21.8 (71.2)	20.3 (68.5)	19.6 (67.3)	19.7 (67.5)	20.2 (68.4)	21.3 (70.3)	22.5 (72.5)	23.1 (73.6)	21.7 (71.0)
Record low °C (°F)	17.0 (62.6)	16.6 (61.9)	14.0 (57.2)	17.8 (64.0)	16.2 (61.2)	13.5 (56.3)	13.8 (56.8)	13.0 (55.4)	14.7 (58.5)	16.3 (61.3)	18.2 (64.8)	18.7 (65.7)	13.0 (55.4)
Average precipitation mm (inches)	241.7 (9.52)	242.7 (9.56)	162.1 (6.38)	53.0 (2.09)	15.7 (0.62)	13.4 (0.53)	13.9 (0.55)	12.4 (0.49)	7.6 (0.30)	16.2 (0.64)	30.5 (1.20)	133.1 (5.24)	942.3 (37.12)
Average precipitation days (≥ 1.0 mm)	15.4	14.6	11.4	5.2	2.4	2.6	3.3	2.3	2.3	2.6	3.6	9.2	74.9
Average relative humidity (%)	79	92	81	76	70	68	66	66	66	65	71	76	72
Mean monthly sunshine hours	189.2	170.0	214.9	256.4	284.8	256.5	273.1	283.6	293.3	306.8	281.5	228.9	3,039
Source 1: NOAA
Source 2: Deutscher Wetterdienst (humidity, 1951–1967), Meteo Climat (record highs and lows)

== Places of worship ==
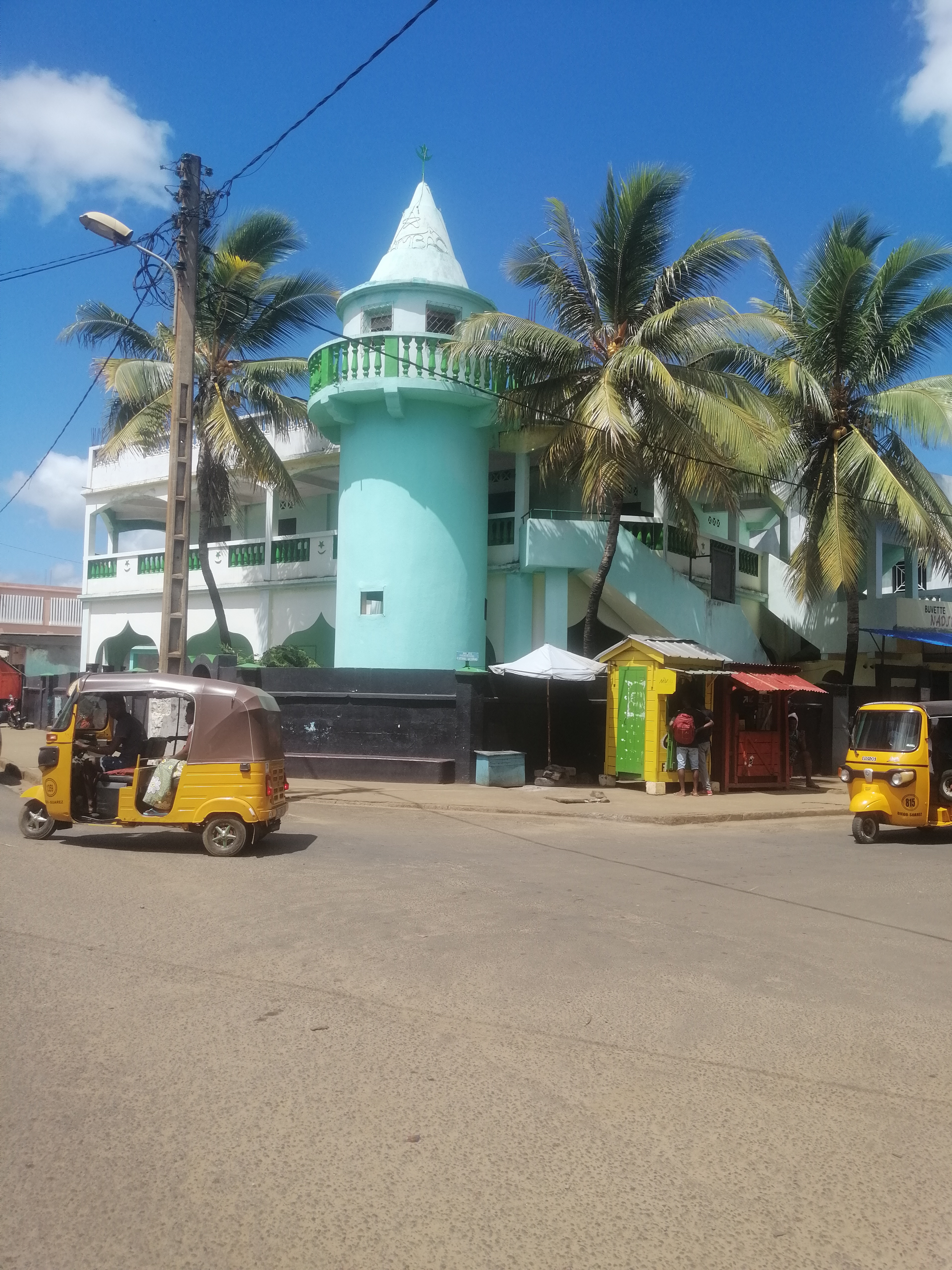
Mosquée Bambao Antsiranana

Among the places of worship, they are predominantly Christian churches and temples:

- FJKM – Fiangonan'i Jesoa Kristy eto Madagasikara (Church of Jesus Christ in Madagascar)
- FLM – Fiangonana Loterana Malagasy (Malagasy Lutheran Church)
- Assemblies of God
- Fiangonara Batista Biblika (Baptiste church)
- Roman Catholic Diocese of Antsiranana (Catholic Church seated in the Cathedral of St. Matthew).
- Church of the Province of the Indian Ocean (Anglican Church)

There are also Muslim mosques.

== Neighborhoods ==
- Cap Diego
- Place Bazary
- Grand Pavois
- Avenir
- Lazaret Nord
- Mangarivotra
- Bazarikely
- Tanambao Nord
- Tanambao Tsena
- Tanambao Sud
- Tanambao III
- Tanambao IV
- Tanambao V
- Lazaret Sud
- Mahatsara
- Soafeno
- Cité Ouvrière
- Ambohimitsinjo
- Morafeno
- Manongalaza
- Ambalavola
- SCAMA
- Anamakia
- Tsaramandroso

== See also ==
- Antsiranana Bay
- Decauville railway at Diégo Suarez
