= Sirama =

- Location in Madagascar
- Coordinates: 13°06′S 48°56′E
- Country: Madagascar
- Region: Diana
- District: Ambilobe
- Elevation: 18 m (59 ft)

Population (2018)Census
  - Total: 22,966
- Time zone: UTC3 (EAT)
- Postal code: 204

Sirama is a municipality in Madagascar. It belongs to the district of Ambilobe, which is a part of Diana Region.

The municipality was named after the sugar factory with the same name: Sirama that has its seat in the town. It is situated at the Mahavavy River, not far from its former port Antsohimbondrona (formerly called: Port Saint-Louis).

== Roads ==
The provincial road 20D connects Sirama to: Antsohimbondrona - Sirama - Ambilobe.
