= List of World Heritage Sites in Madagascar =

Location of World Heritage Sites in Madagascar. Blue dots indicate the Rainforests of the Atsinanana (13 sites). Purple dots are the Andrefana Dry Forests (six sites).

The United Nations Educational, Scientific and Cultural Organization (UNESCO) World Heritage Sites are places of importance to cultural or natural heritage as described in the 1972 UNESCO World Heritage Convention. Cultural heritage consists of monuments (such as architectural works, monumental sculptures, or inscriptions), groups of buildings, and sites (including archaeological sites). Natural heritage consists of natural features (physical and biological formations), geological and physiographical formations (including habitats of threatened species of animals and plants), and natural sites which are important from the point of view of science, conservation, or natural beauty. Madagascar ratified the convention on July 19, 1983, making its historical sites eligible for inclusion on the list. As of 2025, there are three World Heritage Sites in Madagascar. Madagascar served on the World Heritage Committee from 2005 to 2009.

The first site in Madagascar, the Strict Nature Reserve of the Tsingy of Bemaraha, was inscribed on the list as a site of natural importance at the 14th Session of the World Heritage Committee, held in Banff, Canada in 1990. This was followed by the 2001 inscription of the Royal Hill of Ambohimanga, a historic village and royal palace compound of cultural importance featuring well-preserved 19th-century palaces and numerous other natural and architectural features of historic, political and spiritual significance to the Malagasy people. Most recently, in 2007 the natural site of the Rainforests of the Atsinanana was added to the list, comprising a cluster of six national parks distinguished by their highly endemic biodiversity. A fourth site, the capital of the 19th century Merina sovereigns of Madagascar at the Rova of Antananarivo, had originally been slated to become the nation's first cultural World Heritage Site in 1995 but was destroyed by a fire shortly before the inscription was finalized. UNESCO placed the Rainforests of the Atsinanana on the list of World Heritage in Danger on July 30, 2010, following an increase in illegal logging in the parks since 2009 as a consequence of the 2009-2013 political crisis in Madagascar.

== World Heritage Sites ==
UNESCO lists sites under ten criteria; each entry must meet at least one of the criteria. Criteria i through vi are cultural, and vii through x are natural.

† Site listed as "in danger"

Site	Image	Location (Region)	Year listed	UNESCO data	Description
Andrefana Dry Forests	Tsingy	Diana, Boeny, Anosy, Atsimo-Andrefana, Androy, Sava, Melaky	1990, 2023	494; vii, ix, x (natural)	This site comprises six conservation areas protecting the dry forests of western Madagascar (andrefana is Malagasy for "west"): the Tsingy de Bemaraha National Park, Ankarana Reserve, Ankarafantsika National Park, Tsimanampetsotse National Park, Analamerana Reserve and Mikea National Park. In contrast with the Rainforests of the Antsinanana, the parks included in the Dry Forests of the Andrefana are each located within semi-arid ecoregions and feature an entirely distinct set of highly biodiverse and endemic wildlife. Andreafana Dry Forests is a 2023 extension to the Tsingy de Bemaraha Strict Nature Reserve World Heritage Site first designated in 1990.
Royal Hill of Ambohimanga	Ambohimanga	Analamanga	2001	950; iii, iv, vi (cultural)	The Royal Hill of Ambohimanga in the central highlands has been a spiritual and political center for the Merina people since at least the 16th century. Home to numerous kings (including Andrianampoinimerina, who undertook the ultimately successful initiative to unite the island of Madagascar under a single ruler) and designated site of many sacred royal rituals, the hill and the village that crowns it remain sites of pilgrimage to this day.
Rainforests of the Atsinanana†	Marojejy National Park	Sava, Ambatosoa, Analanjirofo, Haute Matsiatra, Vatovavy, Fitovinany, Ihorombe, Anosy	2007	1257; ix, x (natural)	The six national parks in eastern Madagascar that make up this site (atsinanana is Malagasy for "east") host a wide array of the distinctive flora and fauna endemic to Madagascar's rainforest ecosystems. The plant and animal life in these parks are threatened as the demands of a growing human population hasten deforestation and the fragmentation of remaining forests. This site was inscribed on the list of World Heritage in Danger in 2010 due to an increase in illegal logging in the parks following the 2009 coup d'état.

== Tentative list ==
In addition to the sites inscribed on the World Heritage list, member states can maintain a list of tentative sites that they may consider for nomination. Nominations for the World Heritage list are only accepted if the site was previously listed on the tentative list. As of 2024, Madagascar recorded seven sites on its tentative list.

Site	Image	Location	Year listed	UNESCO criteria	Description
Former industrial site of Mantasoa	Betafo	Mantasoa	2018	ii, iv (cultural)	The site is a historical, cultural, and tourist site composed of a collection of stone and wooden monuments built by Jean Laborde (1800–1878), a Frenchman in the service of Queen Ranavalona I (1828–1861).
Sainte-Marie catholic church of Ambodifototra		Ambodifototra	2018	ii (cultural)	The Ambodifotatra Catholic Church represents the result of a decade-long evangelization effort (1837 to 1847) led by Father Pierre Dalmond in Madagascar, with a focus on Sainte Marie, Nosy-Be, Tuléar, and extending to the Comoros and Mayotte.
Mahafaly country of Southwestern Madagascar	Mahafaly tomb	Atsimo-Andrefana	1997	(mixed)	The south-west of Madagascar is inhabited by the Mahafaly people, who farm and herd their zebu within the arid ecosystem of the spiny forests, a semi-desert landscape of endemic succulents which include all plants of the family Didiereaceae. The Mahafaly are famed for such funerary art as highly ornate stone tombs and carved wooden grave posts (aloalo), which have become emblematic of the island of Madagascar.
Nosy Lonjo of Antsiranana	Nosy Lonjo	Antsiranana	2018	ii, vii (mixed)	Nosy Lonjo is a mixed-use site situated at the northernmost point of Madagascar, nestled in the Bay of Diego-Suarez, within the Ramena Commune of the Antsiranana District.
NOSYnakà (Sahamalaza, Nosy Hara, Nosy Tanikely, Lokobe, Ambodivahibe, Ankarea, Ankivonjy)	Nosy Be panther chameleon	Sahamalaza, Nosy Hara, Nosy Tanikely, Lokobe, Ambodivahibe, Ankarea, Ankivonjy	2018	vii, ix, x (natural)	The site consists of 7 marine protected areas: Nosy Hara Marine National Park, Sahamalaza Radama Islands National, Lokobe National Park, Nosy Tanikely National Park, Ambodivahibe Marine Reserve, Ankivonjy Marine Protected Area, and Ankarea Marine Protected Area.
Anjanaharibe-Sud Special Reserve: Extension of the Rainforests of the Atsinanana	Anjanaharibe-Sud	Sava	2008	ix, x (natural)	Anjanaharibe-Sud lies east of Marojejy National Park, one of six parks constituting the Rainforests of the Atsinanana World Heritage Site. Numerous endemic plant species are found in Anjanaharibe-Sud, and the forest corridor of Betaolana connects the park to Marojejy, ensuring the wildlife of both parks access to greater territorial range.
Upper Town of Antananarivo	Upper Town of Antananarivo	Analamanga	2016	ii, v, vi (cultural)	The Upper Town of Antananarivo is an urban site of exceptional quality that has no equivalent in sub-Saharan Africa. The mix of typically Malagasy architectural elements and elements from the colonial presence has shaped a unique architecture of high quality that is still sufficiently well preserved. The site is not only characterized by its architecture, but also by a specific urban form in which the elements of the landscape play an important role and contribute to the creation of a coherent urban ensemble of high heritage quality.

== See also ==
- UNESCO Intangible Cultural Heritage Lists
