= Montagne des Français =

Protected area in Madagascar

Montagne des Français Reserve
- IUCN category V (protected landscape/seascape)
- Location within Madagascar
- Location: Ramena, Diana Region, Northern Madagascar
- Nearest city: Antsiranana (12 km)
- Coordinates: 12°20′28″S 49°20′43″E
- Area: 50 km^{2} (19 sq mi)
- Established: 2007
- Visitors: unknown

Ambohitrantsingy, also known as the Montagne des Français Reserve (French for: mountain of the French) is a protected area consisting principally of dry deciduous forest in northern Madagascar. It is part of the larger Ramena protected area complex which also includes Orangea Reserve and the Ambodivahibe Marine Reserve. These three protected areas are currently being created and will be designated in 2008.

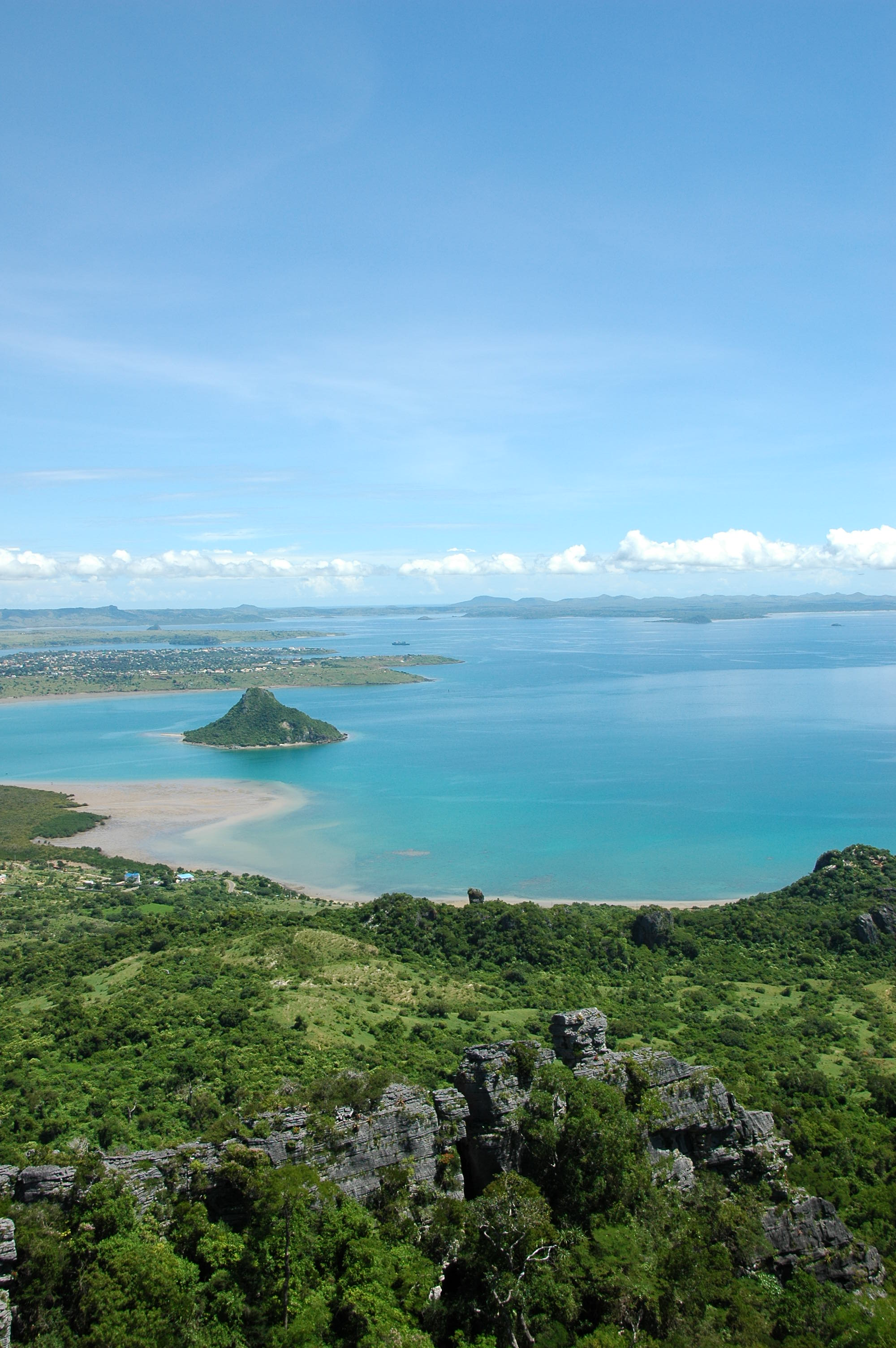
Fort Anosiravo, at the summit of Ambohitrantsingy (Montagne des français) provides views of the Bay of Diego, the city of Antsiranana and Nosy Lonjo

== Flora and fauna ==
The Montagne des Français reserve protects deciduous dry forest characteristic of the north of Madagascar. Much of the forest is on a calcareous massif that has been eroded into karst formations known locally as Antsingy. The forested area ranges from 100–450 metres above sea level. This mountain is thought to receive more rain than the surrounding area (Antsiranana receives approximately 1000mm precipitation annually) which explains the lush vegetation in an otherwise very dry bioclimatic zone. Preliminary botanical and zoological inventories have been done that show these forests are rich in both fauna and flora and include a remarkable number of local and regional endemic species. In particular this is one of the best places to see the baobab Adansonia suarezensis as well as an aloe, Aloe suarezensis, both of which are restricted to this area of northern Madagascar. Other locally endemic plants of interest include the flame tree, Delonix regia, the rare Diegodendron humbertii known from only a few dozen individuals, and Baudouina solleyformis, which is used locally as a traditional protection against witchcraft. To date, 242 species from 58 families and 158 genera have been described from the Montagne des Français; the five most important families that account for over 40% of the species are the Rubiaceae, Fabaceae, Malvaceae, Euphorbiaceae and Sapindaceae.

Zoological surveys to date have identified 19 species of amphibian, 52 reptile species, 56 birds and 21 mammals. Of the herpetofauna, eight species are endemic to the Montagne des Français, 28 are regional endemics, 2 are listed as globally threatened in IUCN's 2006 Red List and 14 species are CITES listed.

== Conservation ==
The main threats to the Montagne des Français are linked to demand for wood-based products from the nearby city of Antsiranana. Logging for timber and charcoal production are the main threats. Unlike most of Madagascar, slash and burn agriculture is not a major threat since most of the remaining forest is on land unsuitable for agriculture.

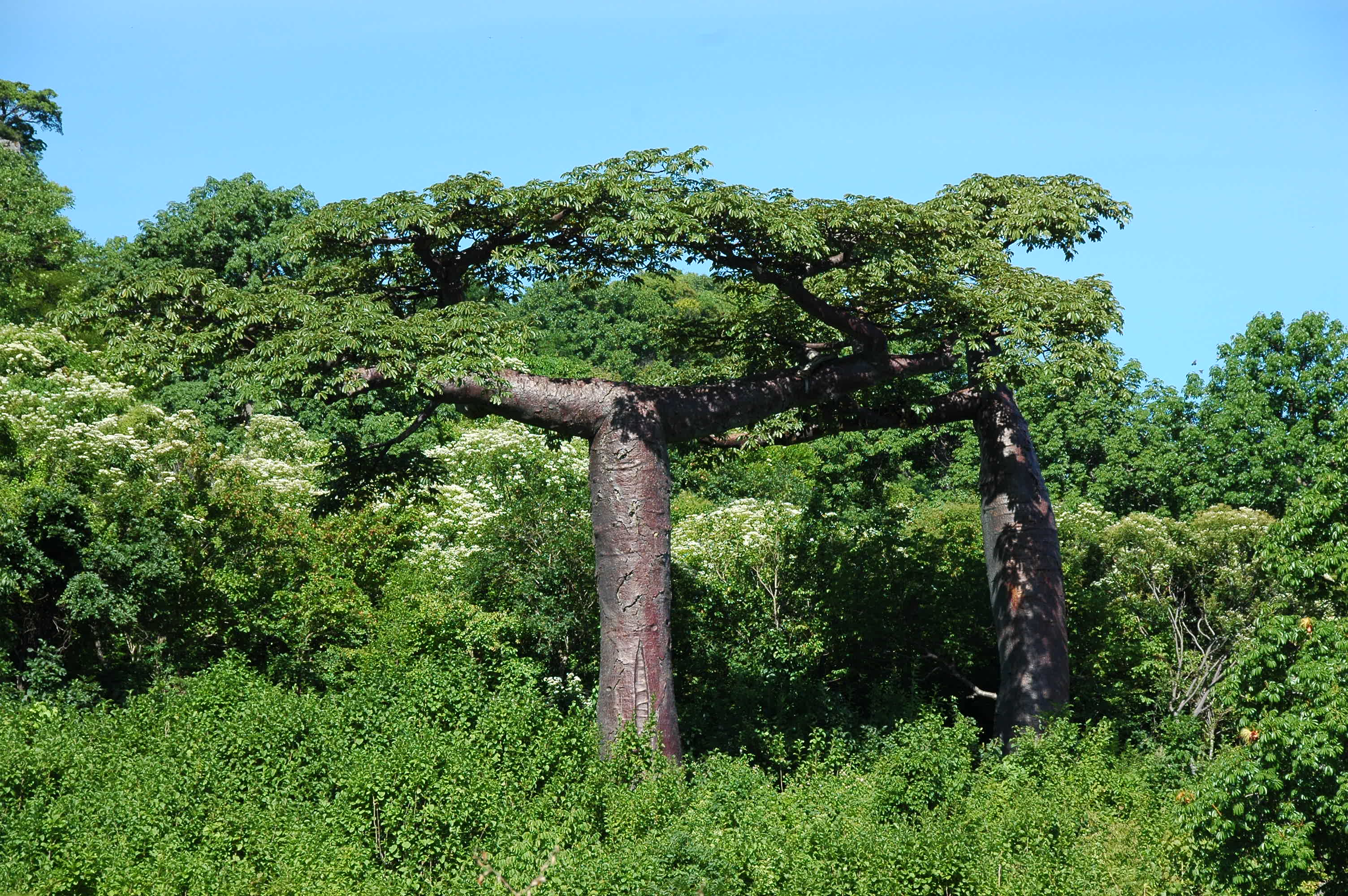
The shiny brown bark of Adansonia suarezensis distinguishes this regional endemic from other baobab species

Several other karst limestone areas are also protected in Madagascar including Tsingy de Bemaraha, Tsingy de Namoroka and the Tsingy d’Ankarana reserve 100 km to the south of Montagne des Français. The current effort to create a new reserve in the Montagne des Francais involves many local organizations and is being headed up by the local regional government with technical support and funding from Conservation International.

== Tourism ==
The Montagne des Francais is accessible from the city of Antsiranana (better known as Diego Suarez). The base of a trail leading to the summit can be reached approximately 12 km by the paved National road 59b from Diego Suarez to Ramena. The trail to the summit takes approximately 2 hours and several viewpoints along the way and at the summit provide views over the Diego Bay. The remains of several fortifications dating from the French colonial period can still be seen. These fortifications and the whole area around Diego were the scene of fierce fighting during World War II between the Vichy French colonialists and British occupying forces.

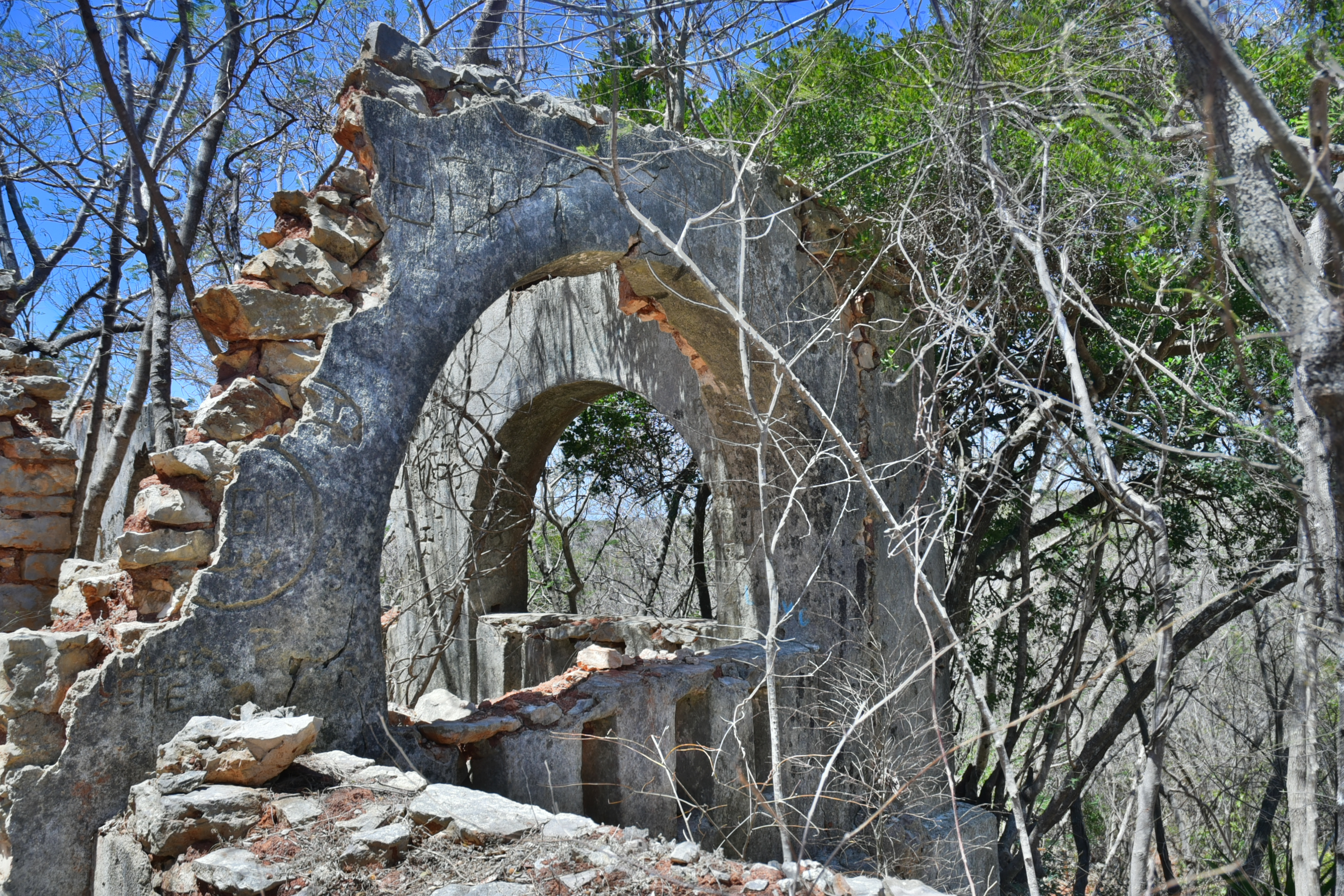
Ruins of the barracks of the commander of Fort Anosiravo, at the summit of Ambohitrantsingy (formerly known as Montagne des Français), in Antsiranana, Madagascar

== See also ==
- National parks of Madagascar
