= Tanambao Marivorahona =

Tanambao Marivorahona Marivorahona
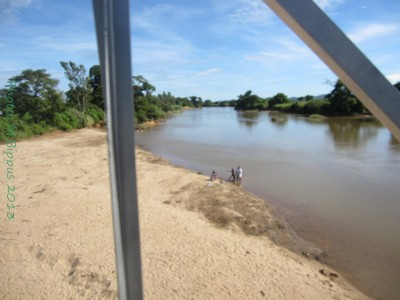
- Manajeba River at Marivorahona

- Location in Madagascar
- Coordinates: 13°5′S 49°5′E
- Country: Madagascar
- Region: Diana
- District: Ambilobe

Government
  - Mayor: Justin Bemiarina
- Elevation: 24 m (79 ft)

Population (2018)
  - Total: 15,654
- Time zone: UTC3 (EAT)
- Postal code: 204

Marivorahona or Tanambao Marivorahona is a municipality (French: commune, Malagasy: kaominina) in northern Madagascar. It belongs to the district of Ambilobe, which is a part of Diana Region.

According to 2018 census the population of Tanambao Marivorahona was 15,654.

Only primary schooling is available in town. The majority (94%) of the population are farmers. The most important crops are sugarcane and tomato, while other important agricultural products are cotton, sweet potato and rice. Industry and services both provide employment for 3% of the population.

== Geographie ==
Tanambao Marivorahona lies 13 km from Ambilobe and 123 km from Antsiranana (Diego Suarez) on the RN 6 in the fertile plains of the Manajeba River. It covers also the villages (fokontany) of Ananjaka, Antsatrambalo, Ambodiampana, Mahamasina, Bobasatrana, Isesy, Mahavelona, Marivorahona, Tanambao Marivorahona and Betsimiranjana.

The entrance of the Ankarana Reserve is in Mahamasina.
