= Nosy Mitsio =

Island off the northwest coast of Madagascar

Coordinates: 12.9°S 48.6°E

- Location within Madagascar

Geography
- Location: Antsohimbondrona (commune), Diana Region, Madagascar
- Archipelago: Mitsio
- Total islands: 11
- Major islands: Nosy Mitsio, Nosy Lava, Ankarea, Tsarabanjina
- Area: 29.7 km^{2} (11.5 sq mi)
- Highest elevation: 206 m (676 ft)
- Highest point: Mt Ankarana

Administration
- Madagascar
- Largest settlement: Bevoako, Nosy Mitsio

Demographics
- Population: ~3000
- Ethnic groups: Antakarana

Nosy Mitsio is an island off the northwest coast of Madagascar. It is located 70 km (40 miles) north-east of Nosy Be and 60 km (40 miles) north-west of the city of Ambilobe. Owing to the Mitsio archipelago being distant from other large bodies of land, Nosy Mitsio offers crystal clear waters, white sandy beaches, lush coconut palms and a marine fauna with abundant reefs distant from the island perimeter. Nosy Mitsio is the only inhabited island of the Mitsio archipelago (other than Tsarabanjina, which has a small population that caters to tourism for the hotel on the island). Nosy Mitsio is very rural: it has no infrastructural development and is populated mainly by small family villages, that belong to the municipality of Antsohimbondrona. There are several primary schools and very limited access to healthcare services. Most inhabitants of Nosy Mitsio are subsistence rice farmers who also use a variety of fishing methods and shellfish gathering. Supplemental income is provided through salting fish, diving for sea cucumbers, and gathering coconuts - all of which is sold at Port St Louis, the nearest port on mainland Madagascar.
