= Betsihaka =

- Location in Madagascar
- Coordinates: 13°9′S 49°14′E
- Country: Madagascar
- Region: Diana
- District: Ambilobe
- Elevation: 52 m (171 ft)

Population (2001)
  - Total: 10,661
- Time zone: UTC3 (EAT)
- Postal code: 204

Betsihaka or Betsiaka is a rural municipality in Madagascar. It is part of the district of Ambilobe, which is in the Diana Region. According to the 2001 commune census, the population of Betsihaka was 10,661.

The genus Triadobatrachus, an extinct amphibian, was discovered there.

Only primary schooling is available in the town. 60% of the population are farmers, while an additional 38% receive their livelihood from raising livestock. The most important crop is rice; other important products are maize and seeds of catechu. Industry and services each provide employment for 1% of the population.

== Roads ==
Betsiaka is situated on the National road 5a.

== Protected areas ==
- Andrafiamena Andavakoera New Protected Area
