= Anaborano Ifasy =

- Location in Madagascar
- Coordinates: 13°41′S 48°50′E
- Country: Madagascar
- Region: Diana
- District: Ambilobe
- Elevation: 370 m (1,210 ft)

Population (2001)
  - Total: 24,852
- Time zone: UTC3 (EAT)

Anaborano Ifasy is a municipality (French: commune, Malagasy: kaominina) in Madagascar. It belongs to the district of Ambilobe, which is a part of Diana Region. According to 2001 census the population of Anaborano Ifasy was 24852.

Primary and junior level secondary education are available in town. The town provides access to hospital services to its citizens. The majority (95%) of the population are farmers. The most important crop is rice, while other important products are cocoa, coffee and pepper. Services provide employment for 5% of the population.
