= Manambato =

- Location in Madagascar
- Coordinates: 13°42′S 49°7′E
- Country: Madagascar
- Region: Diana
- District: Ambilobe
- Elevation: 268 m (879 ft)

Population (2001)
  - Total: 7,000
- Time zone: UTC3 (EAT)

Manambato is a municipality (French: commune, Malagasy: kaominina) in Madagascar. It belongs to the district of Ambilobe, which is a part of Diana Region. It is situated at the Mahavavy River.

According to 2001 census the population of Manambato was 7000.

Only primary schooling is available in town. The majority (99%) of the population are farmers. The most important crop is rice, while other important products are maize, seeds of catechu and vanilla. Services provide employment for 1% of the population.
