= Mantaly =

- Location in Madagascar
- Coordinates: 13°10′S 48°58′E
- Country: Madagascar
- Region: Diana
- District: Ambilobe
- Elevation: 23 m (75 ft)

Population (2001)
  - Total: 14,420
- Time zone: UTC3 (EAT)

Mantaly is a town and commune (Malagasy: kaominina) in Madagascar. It belongs to the district of Ambilobe, which is a part of Diana Region. According to 2001 commune census the population of Mantaly was 14,420.

Mantaly is served by a local airport. Primary and junior level secondary education are available in town. The majority 95% of the population are farmers, while an additional 4.5% receives their livelihood from raising livestock. The most important crop is rice, while other important products are banana, coffee and sugarcane. Services provide employment for 0.5% of the population.
