= Mananjeba River =

Manajeba River
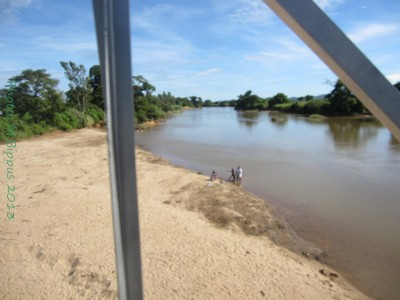
- Manajeba River at Marivorahona

Location
- Country: Madagascar
- Region: Diana
- City: Marivorahona

Physical characteristics
- Source: Tsaratanana Massif
  - location: Diana
  - elevation: 1,785 m (5,856 ft)
- Mouth
  - location: Indian Ocean
  - coordinates: 12°53′00″S 48°56′30″E
  - elevation: 0 m (0 ft)
- Length: 248 km (154 mi)
- Basin size: 2,198.6 km^{2} (848.9 sq mi)
- Discharge
  - location: Near mouth
  - average: (Period: 1971–2000)59.3 m^{3}/s (2,090 cu ft/s)
- Discharge
  - location: Marivorahona (1980–1983)
  - average: 24.2 m^{3}/s (850 cu ft/s)- (1980–1983)
  - minimum: 0.497 m^{3}/s (17.6 cu ft/s)
  - maximum: 220 m^{3}/s (7,800 cu ft/s)

The Manajeba River is located in northern Madagascar. Its sources are situated near in the Tsaratanana Massif; it crosses the Route nationale 6 near Tanambao Marivorahona and flows into the Indian Ocean.

In January 2012, the bridge of 32 meters of the Route nationale 6 collapsed between Tanambao Marivorahona and the village of Marivorahona.
