= Ampondralava =

- Location in Madagascar
- Coordinates: 13°10′S 48°56′E
- Country: Madagascar
- Region: Diana
- District: Ambilobe
- Elevation: 20 m (66 ft)

Population (2001)
  - Total: 6,381
- Time zone: UTC3 (EAT)

Ampondralava is a municipality (French: commune, Malagasy: kaominina) in Madagascar. It belongs to the district of Ambilobe, which is a part of Diana Region. According to 2001 census the population of Ampondralava was 6381.

Primary and junior level secondary education are available in town. The majority (99%) of the population are farmers. The most important crops are rice and sugarcane; also cotton is an important agricultural product. Services provide employment for 1% of the population.
