= Ampombiantambo =

Coordinates: 12°42′S 48°57′E

Ampombiantambo is a small town in Ramena commune, in the region of Diana in northern Madagascar, near Mount Ambohitra. It is approximately 70 kilometres (43 mi) south-west of Antsiranana. It is also northeast of Nosy Be.

== History ==
In the early 20th century, the town was notorious for its endemic malaria and other tropical diseases.

In the 21st century, malaria and other diseases being controlled, it is better known as a trail section near Montagne d'Ambre National Park, especially popular with through-hikers wishing to avoid the crowds from cruise ships who go to the main trail into the park. There is a secondary road that connects the village with larger towns and cities to the north and south.
