= Ambarakaraka =

- Location in Madagascar
- Coordinates: 13°30′S 48°52′E
- Country: Madagascar
- Region: Diana
- District: Ambilobe
- Elevation: 63 m (207 ft)

Population (2001)
  - Total: 16,114
- Time zone: UTC3 (EAT)

Ambarakaraka is a town and commune (Malagasy: kaominina) in Madagascar. It belongs to the district of Ambilobe, which is a part of Diana Region. According to 2001 commune census the population of Ambarakaraka was 16114.

Only primary schooling is available in town. The majority 90% of the population are farmers, while an additional 7% receives their livelihood from raising livestock. The most important crop is rice, while other important products are coffee, seeds of catechu and pepper. Services provide employment for 3% of the population.
