= Ambakirano =

- Location in Madagascar
- Coordinates: 13°26′S 49°12′E
- Country: Madagascar
- Region: Diana
- District: Ambilobe
- Elevation: 222 m (728 ft)

Population (2001)
  - Total: 16,000
- Time zone: UTC3 (EAT)

Ambakirano is a town and commune (Malagasy: kaominina) in Madagascar. It belongs to the district of Ambilobe, which is a part of Diana Region. According to 2001 commune census the population of Ambakirano was 16,000.

Primary and junior level secondary education are available in town. The majority 50% of the population are farmers, while an additional 46% receives their livelihood from raising livestock. The most important crops are rice and cotton, while other important agricultural products are seeds of catechu and tobacco. Industry and services provide both employment for 2% of the population.
