= Anjiabe Ambony =

- Location in Madagascar
- Coordinates: 13°14′S 48°52′E
- Country: Madagascar
- Region: Diana
- District: Ambilobe
- Elevation: 10 m (33 ft)

Population (2001)
  - Total: 5,285
- Time zone: UTC3 (EAT)

Anjiabe Ambony is a town and commune (Malagasy: kaominina) in Madagascar. It belongs to the district of Ambilobe, which is a part of Diana Region. According to 2001 commune census the population of Anjiabe Ambony was 5,285.

Primary and junior level secondary education are available in town. The majority 90% of the population are farmers, while 1% receives their livelihood from raising livestock. The most important crop is sugarcane, while other important products are cotton and rice. Industry and services provide employment for 5% and 1% of the population, respectively. Additionally fishing employs 3% of the population.
