= Port Saint Louis =

Port Saint Louis can be:

- the original name of Puerto Soledad on the Falklands
- Port-Saint-Louis-du-Rhône, a commune in southern France
- Port Saint-Louis, the former French name of Antsohimbondrona, in Madagascar
