= Beramanja =

- Location in Madagascar
- Coordinates: 13°20′S 48°52′E
- Country: Madagascar
- Region: Diana
- District: Ambilobe
- Elevation: 15 m (49 ft)

Population (2001)
  - Total: 26,273
- Time zone: UTC3 (EAT)

Beramanja is a town and commune (Malagasy: kaominina) in Madagascar. It belongs to the district of Ambilobe, which is a part of Diana Region. According to 2001 commune census the population of Beramanja was 26,273.

Beramanja has a riverine harbour. Primary and junior level secondary education are available in town. The majority of the population 58% works in fishing. 37% are farmers, while an additional 3% receives their livelihood from raising livestock. The most important crop is coffee, while other important products are maize, sweet potatoes and rice. Industry and services provide both employment for 1% of the population.
