= Mangaoka =

- Location in Madagascar
- Coordinates: 12°18′S 49°7′E
- Country: Madagascar
- Region: Diana
- District: Antsiranana II
- Elevation: 34 m (112 ft)
- Time zone: UTC3 (EAT)

Mangaoka is a rural municipality in Madagascar. It belongs to the district of Antsiranana II, which is a part of Diana Region. It is situated at the Indian Ocean, in northern Madagascar.

Primary and junior level secondary education are available in town. The majority of the population are farmers. The most important crops are rice and maize, while other important agricultural products are banana and cassava. Services provide employment for 0.5% of the population, while fishing employs 4.5% of the population.

== Mining ==
The Ampasindava mine, a rare earth mine, is situated in the municipality.
