= Ambalan'anjavy =

Coordinates: 13.3374°S 49.0217°E

- Interactive map of Ambalan'anjavy
- Country: Madagascar
- Region: Diana
- District: Ambilobe

Population (2001)
  - Total: 3,743
- Time zone: UTC3 (EAT)

Ambalan'anjavy is a town and commune (Malagasy: kaominina) in Madagascar. It belongs to the district of Ambilobe, which is a part of Diana Region. According to 2001 commune census the population of Ambalan'anjavy was 3,743.

Only primary schooling is available in town. The majority 95% of the population are farmers, while an additional 4% receives their livelihood from raising livestock. The most important crop is rice, while other important products are cotton and seeds of catechu. Services provide employment for 0.5% of the population. Additionally fishing employs 0.5% of the population.
