= Antsaravibe =

- Location in Madagascar
- Coordinates: 13°3′S 49°1′E
- Country: Madagascar
- Region: Diana
- District: Ambilobe
- Elevation: 18 m (59 ft)

Population (2001)
  - Total: 10,648
- Time zone: UTC3 (EAT)

Antsaravibe is a municipality (French: commune, Malagasy: kaominina) in Madagascar. It belongs to the district of Ambilobe, which is a part of Diana Region. According to 2001 census the population of Antsaravibe was 10,648.

Primary and junior level secondary education are available in town. The majority of the population (50%) works in fishing, while 49% are farmers. The most important crops are sugarcane and cotton; also tobacco is an important agricultural product. Services provide employment for 1% of the population.
