= Ambodibonara, Ambilobe =

Ambodibonara
- Location in Madagascar
- Coordinates: 13°12′S 48°50′E
- Country: Madagascar
- Region: Diana
- District: Ambilobe
- Elevation: 10 m (33 ft)

Population (2001)
  - Total: 6,418
- Time zone: UTC3 (EAT)

Ambodibonara is a municipality (French: commune, Malagasy: kaominina) in Madagascar. It belongs to the district of Ambilobe, which is a part of Diana Region. According to 2001 census the population of Ambodibonara was 6418.

Only primary schooling is available in town. The majority (69%) of the population are farmers. The most important crops are rice and banana, while other important agricultural products are coffee, sugar cane and cotton. Industry and services provide both employment for 0.5% of the population. Additionally fishing employs 30% of the population.
