= Ampasindava mine =

Mining concession on Ampasindava Peninsula, Madagascar

Coordinates: 13°43′00″S 48°07′00″E

- Location within Madagascar
- Location: Mangaoka, Diana Region, Madagascar
- Products: Rare-earths

The Ampasindava mine is an undeveloped mining concession for rare-earth elements mine in Madagascar. It is located in Mangaoka, in northern Madagascar on the eastern side of the Ampasindava Peninsula. As of 2025 it is owned by the Australian-owned Harena Resources. The concession has undergone several changes in ownership and no construction of a mine has yet commenced, at least partly due to environmental concerns.

== History ==
At the end of the 19th century, when Madagascar was a French colony, French geologists conducted studies which looked at a particular granitic rock on the Ampasindava Peninsula known as fasibitikite in the local language. In 1922, the presence of niobium, tantalum, and zirconium in the rock was documented.

From 1988 to 1991, the Soviet Geological Mission explored the potential of the zone in partnership with the French National Military Office for Strategic Industries (OMNIS).

The first exploration licence for the mine was granted to Calibra Resources and Engineers on 18 April 2003, by the High Transitional Authority, which ruled the country until 2013 after a coup d'état deposed president-elect Marc Ravalomanana. This was sold to Zebu Metals in January 2008, which continued to study the potential of the site. In October 2009 it was transferred toTantalus Rare Earths AG (TRE AG), the German firm that owned Tantalum Rare Earth Malagasy (TREM) from 2009. The concession was owned by the TREM in 2012, when the company agreed to supply the rare-earth products of the mine to another company, Rhodia. Tantalus went bankrupt in 2015. TRE AG filed for bankruptcy in 2015, and sold 60% of TREM to REO Magnetic, a private company in Singapore. In September 2017, the sale of the remaining 40% of TREM was cancelled. In June and July 2016, REO sold its stake in the mine to the Singapore-based ISR Capital Ltd. REO was under investigation for financial misconduct.

In June 2019, ISR Capital signed a memorandum of understanding with the China Nonferrous Metal Mining Group to develop the mine. In July 2019, ISR was renamed Reenova Investment Holding. In 2021 Reenova sold its 75% interest in the project for US$4.5 million to the GRM Group.

On 18 September 2020, Reenova Investment Holding Limited (RREM), a Mauritius-based company, made a formal submission to the Madagascar Mining Cadastral Office for a full mining licence (an operating permit, rather than the previous research-only permits (three over 11 years) that had been granted to others) to mine the site. The company engaged a specialist to do an environmental impact assessment, and a mining service provider to begin a pilot project.

Reenova was placed under judicial management in August 2022, and in April 2023, the project was acquired by Harena Resources Pty Ltd. Harena was formed in April 2022 by four Australians, including businessman Allan Mulligan, who named the company as the Malagasy word for "treasure". In October 2022, Harena acquired Reenova Rare Earth Malagasy. As of 2025, Harena Resources is developing the site.

== Description ==
The concession is located in the municipality of Mangaoka, Diana Region, in northern Madagascar on the eastern side of the Ampasindava Peninsula. The mountainous, heavily forested peninsula lies opposite the island of Nosy Be. There are no roads, and villagers, who grow and harvest vanilla, pepper, coffee and cocoa, use the sea to move around and sell their crops.

The mining concession occupies around 300 km^{2} (120 sq mi), which is around a third of the whole peninsula. Most of this area is low-lying, with the highest elevations (up to 713 m (2,339 ft)) in the northwest. The most significant physiographical feature is circular caldera measuring 6 km (3.7 mi) wide, which is part of the Ambohimirahavavy igneous rock complex (aka Ampasibitika intrusion). There mining concession encompasses around 15 villages, including Antsirabe, a prosperous village known for its supply of vanilla, and Betaimboa.

The ion-adsorption clays comprise aluminosilicate clay minerals, including kaolinite, illite, and smectite, created by the process of lateritic weathering of the host rocks. The Ambohimirahavavy ores are enriched with the rare-earth elements neodymium (Nd) and praseodymium (Pr) (together NdPr) and dysprosium (Dy) and terbium (Tb) (together DyTb). "Rare-earths" is a term applied to 17 elements which have particular properties, such as their magnetism, which make them valuable components in the manufacture of renewable energy technologies such as wind turbines, solar panels, and electric vehicles. Dysprosium, neodymium, and europium are among the most expensive, and they are in the ground at Ampasindava. Around 8 kg (18 lb) of rare-earths are estimated to be present in each 10 tonnes of clay rock.

In May 2023, the Madagasacan Government announced the lifting of the moratorium introduced in 2011 that stopped mining licenses being granted. A new mining code requires that companies pay increased royalties (5%; previously 2%) on the value of exported resources.

As of 2023, the site consisted of a number of scattered holes, some partially filled or covered, and five 20-metre (66 ft) wide basins lined with old decaying tarpaulins, alongside vanilla vines and native forest. Since 2023 and as of 2025, the Australian company Harena Resources is developing the site.

=== Reserves ===
In December 2011, Ampasindava's mineral resources were estimated at 104,000 tons of rare earth oxides (REO), leading it to be considered "one of the most promising rare earth deposits outside of China". The deposits are shallow, being mostly in the soil lying over the source rock, which makes extracting them relatively easy. In 2012 it was estimated that the deposit had reserves amounting to 130 million tonnes of ore grading 0.08% RE. By October 2014, SGS Canada Inc. had re-estimated this figure to be 562,000 tonnes of REO, which are high in rare-earths regarded as "critical" as well as being low in radioactivity.

As of 2025, it has been determined that the site contains a defined mineral resource of 699 million tonnes at 868 ppm Total Rare Earth Oxides (TREO). According to Harena, Ampasindava is one of the largest rare earth deposits in the world.

== Environmental concerns ==
=== Background ===
The Ampasindava Peninsula is known as "Tanibe Andrefa", meaning "Great Land to the West" by the Sakalava people who live there. The peninsula has a population of around 33,000, spread across 27 villages and four rural communes.

The rest of the peninsula apart from the apart from the 300-square-kilometre (120 sq mi) of mining concession, an area of 900 square kilometres (350 sq mi), is a protected area created in 2015.

The area being developed for mining is located in one of a few remaining areas of primary forests of the Sambirano Domain, and its coastal area is very rich in biodiversity. The flora and fauna are dependent on maintaining these ecosystems, whose delicate balance, according to environmentalists, is threatened by Harena's rare-earths mining project, which could destroy thousands of hectares of native woodland. The effect of clearing on climate change is another concern. Local communities live in poverty and depend on many products of these ecosystems, including food, energy, building materials, medicinal products, some of which provide them with income. Hence local people have been protesting against the development. The ocean is also an area of significant marine biodiversity, where whales come to breed and a few dugongs remain. Along the coast are coral reefs (including the second most diverse one in the world) and extensive mangroves.

Conservation groups have opposed development of the mine, pointing to possible damage the mine could have on wildlife, such as Mittermeier's sportive lemur, which is native to the peninsula. Eight species of lemur live on the peninsula, which include six that are endemic to northwestern Madagascar. Six of the lemur species are endangered, while two others are listed as vulnerable species. Around 80 per cent of all plants in Madacascar are endemic, and eight per cent exist only on the peninsula.

Impacts of the mining, apart from the large amounts of rock that need to be fractured to obtain small amounts of rare-earths, include the use of large amounts of chemicals such as ammonium sulfate, used in the leaching process to isolate the metals from the crushed rock. This poses the risk of groundwater contamination. Another potentially adverse impact is the release of naturally high radioactive materials in the rock, such as thorium and uranium.

=== Opposition ===
After TREM failed to clean up its test pits and conducted research without obtaining consent from the locals, in 2016 a declaration expressing opposition to the project was presented to parliamentarians. The head of TREM sent a letter to the minister of mines complaining of defamation.

The Committee of Reflection and Action for the Development and Environment of Sambirano (CRADES), headed by Raymond Mandiny, is campaigning against rare-earth mining in the area, and he has the support of the Sakalave king, Tsiaraso IV.

Allan Mulligan of Harena resources wrote in response to a query by Le Monde newspaper that this site "is part of the new generation of very low-impact extractive projects [that] will leave a minimal environmental footprint during operations and zero residual impact while producing 'green minerals' vital to the renewable energy sector". He wrote that because the ores are close to the surface, the miners can only process small volumes of rock, and there would be no leaching done at the site. Waste would be washed and replaced at the site of extraction, which would be covered with stockpiled topsoil.

Zo Randriamaro wrote on the Foreign Policy in Focus website in April 2023 that Madagascar had become a "sacrifice zone" where lives in poorer zones are valued less, and thus "sacrificed" so that wealthier countries can make their own energy transition to renewable energy successful.
