= Ambodivahibe Marine Reserve =

Marine reserve in Madagascar

Coordinates: 12°17′S 49°31′E

Ambodivahibe Marine Reserve is a new marine protected area in the municipalities Ramena and Mahavanona in the Diana Region, north-east of Madagascar as an unusually rich zone for marine biodiversity. It covers the Ambodivahibe Bay. A cool upwelling from the deep bay is thought to provide natural resilience to coral bleaching and this may explain the unusually pristine coral habitat.

The area also hosts nationally important areas of mangrove and seagrass habitat as well as endangered marine species including sea turtles and dugongs

C3 Madagascar, a Malagasy non-governmental conservation organisation, implemented a community-based fisheries management project in Ambodivahibe Marine Reserve, Nosy Hara Marine Park and the Bay of Rigny through the European Union-funded ECOFISH programme. Activities included fisheries monitoring, community consultations, capacity building and the development of locally managed fisheries management structures.
