= Antsohimbondrona =

Place in Diana, Madagascar

Antsohimbondrona Port Saint-Louis
- Location in Madagascar
- Coordinates: 13°5′S 48°51′E
- Country: Madagascar
- Region: Diana
- District: Ambilobe
- Elevation: 9 m (30 ft)

Population (2001)
  - Total: 32,080
- Time zone: UTC3 (EAT)
- Postal code: 204

Antsohimbondrona (also called: Port Saint-Louis) is a municipality in Madagascar. It belongs to the district of Ambilobe, which is a part of Diana Region. It is situated in the delta of the Mahavavy River into the Indian Ocean. According to 2001 census the population of Antsohimbondrona was 32080.

Antsohimbondrona has a maritime harbour. Primary and junior level secondary education are available in town. The town provides access to hospital services to its citizens. It is also a site of industrial-scale mining.

The majority (65%) of the population are farmers. The most important crop is sugarcane, while other important products are cotton and rice. Industry and services provide employment for 13% and 7% of the population, respectively. Additionally fishing employs 15% of the population.

== Roads ==
The provincial road 20D leads to Antsohimbondrona from Ambilobe.

== See also ==
- Nosy Mitsio, and island that belongs to Antsohimbondrona.
