= Former industrial site of Mantasoa =

Historic location in Mantasoa, Madagascar

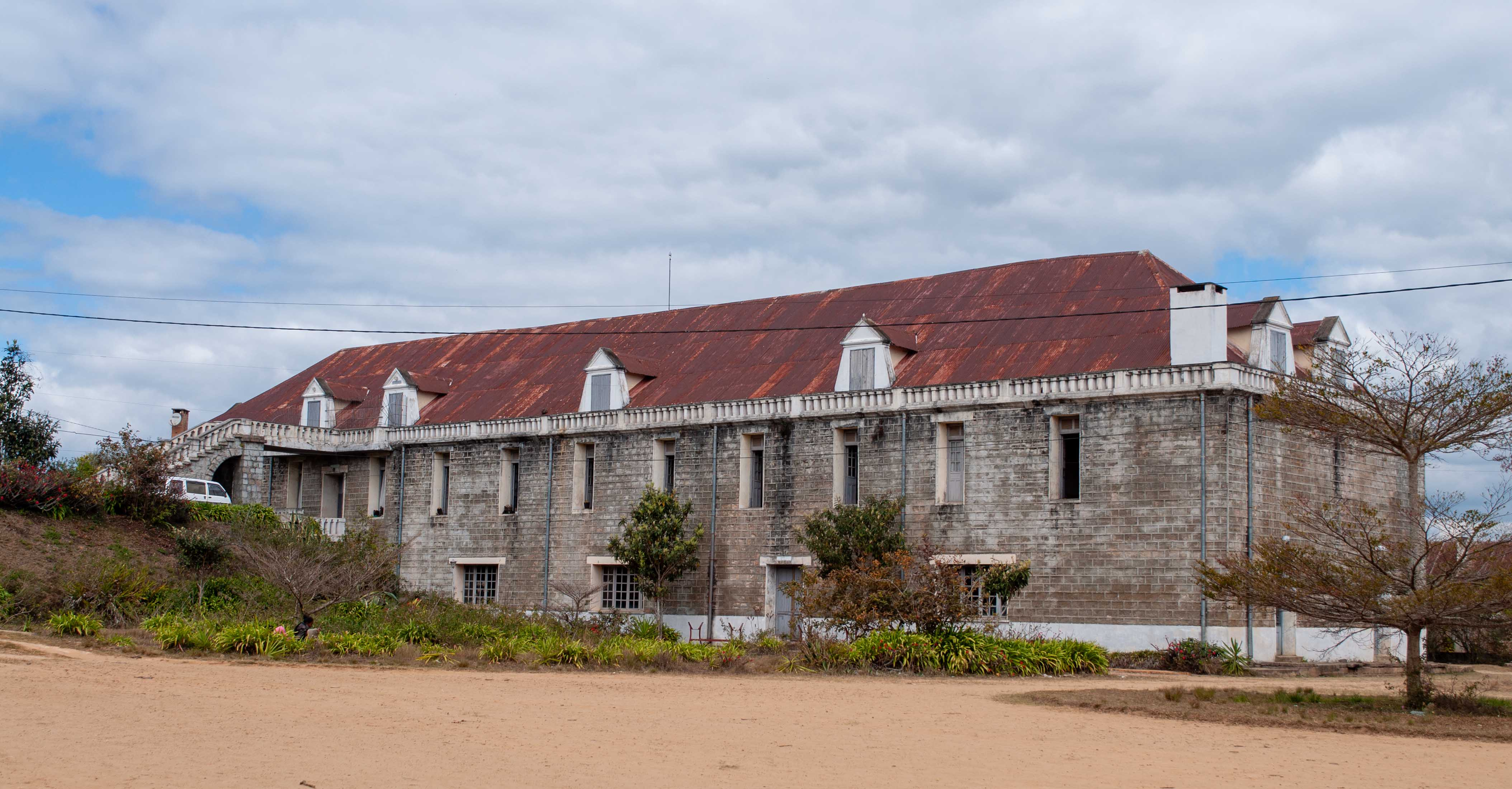
former industrial site of Mantasoa

The former industrial site of Mantasoa is a historical and cultural site located in Madagascar, in the city of Mantasoa.

== Description ==
The Mantasoa industrial site is the first industrial and worker town built in the country. The industrial complex was constructed in the 19th century by Jean Laborde under a contract with Queen Ranavalona I, turning Mantasoa into a prosperous region during the royal era. The site consists of several structures made of stone, brick, and wood. It includes also the monumental tomb of Jean Laborde.

The site has been added on 15 February 2018 to the UNESCO tentative list.

== See also ==
- List of World Heritage Sites in Madagascar
