= Rainforests of the Atsinanana =

Madagascan World Heritage Sitie

UNESCO World Heritage Site
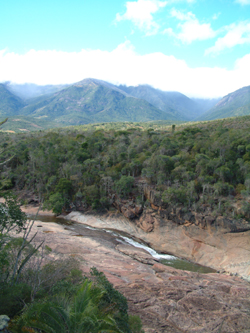
- Andohahela National Park

- Location within Madagascar Location within Africa Location within Indian Ocean
- Location: Madagascar
- Criteria: Natural: (ix), (x)
- Reference: 1257
- Inscription: 2007 (31st Session)
- Endangered: 2010–...
- Area: 479,660.7 ha (1,185,267 acres)
- Coordinates: 14°27′35″S 49°42′9″E

The Rainforests of the Atsinanana is a World Heritage Site that was inscribed in 2007 and consists of 13 specific areas in six national parks in the eastern part of Madagascar:

1. Marojejy National Park
2. Masoala National Park
3. Zahamena National Park
4. Ranomafana National Park
5. Andringitra National Park
6. Andohahela National Park

The Rainforests of the Atsinanana are distributed along the eastern part of the island. These relict forests are critically important for maintaining ongoing ecological processes necessary for the survival of Madagascar's unique biodiversity, which reflects the island's geological history. Having completed its separation from all other land masses more than 60 million years ago, Madagascar's plant and animal life evolved in isolation. The rainforests are inscribed for their importance to both ecological and biological processes as well as their biodiversity and the threatened species they support. Many species are rare and threatened especially lemurs and other primates.

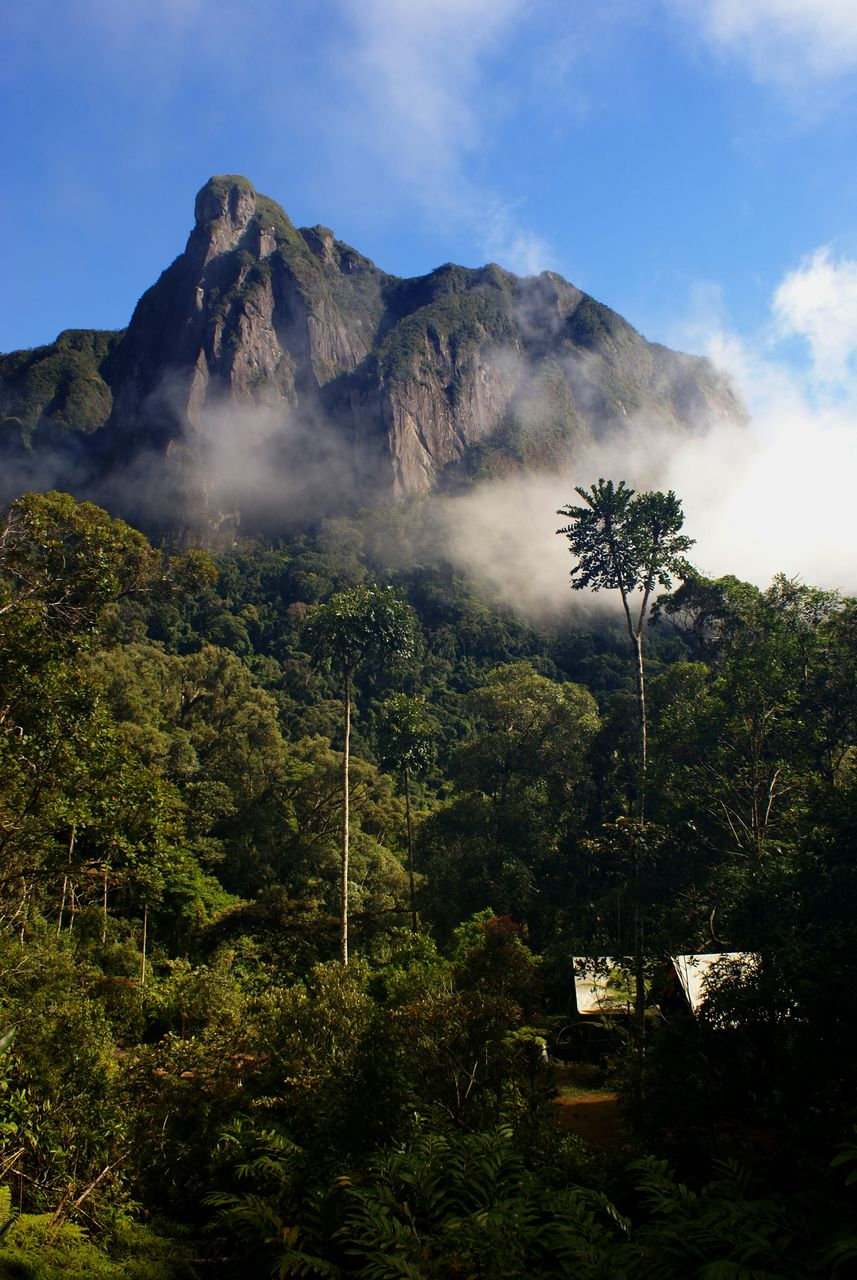
Marojejy National Park

== See also ==
- World Heritage Sites in Madagascar
- Illegal logging in Madagascar
- World Heritage Sites in danger
