= Ambilobe District =

Coordinates: 13°12′S 49°3′E

Ambilobe (district)
- District
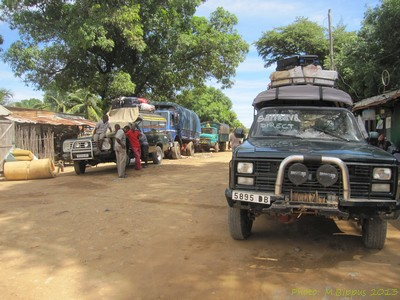
- Interactive map of Ambilobe (district)
- Country: Madagascar

Ambilobe is a district of Diana in Madagascar. Its capitol is the city of Ambilobe.

== Communes ==
The district is further divided into 15 communes:

- Ambakirano
- Ambalan'anjavy
- Ambarakaraka
- Ambilobe
- Ambodibonara
- Ampondralava
- Anaborano Ifasy
- Anjiabe Ambony
- Antsaravibe
- Antsohimbondrona
- Beramanja
- Betsihaka
- Manambato
- Mantaly
- Tanambao Marivorahona

== Protected areas ==
- Part of Andrafiamena Andavakoera protected harmonious landscape
- Part of Galoko Kalobinono protected harmonious landscape
- Part of Ankarana Special Reserve
- Part of Tsaratanana national park
- Ankarea protected harmonious seascape
- Part of COMATSA Avaratra (Marojejy-Anjanaharibe Atsimo-Tsaratanana Corridor North), a natural resources reserve
