= Ambilobe Airport =

Airport in Madagascar

- IATA: AMB; ICAO: FMNE

Summary
- Airport type: Public
- Operator: Government
- Serves: Ambilobe, Madagascar
- Elevation AMSL: 72 ft (22 m)
- Coordinates: 13°11′18″S 048°59′16″E

Map
- Location of airport in Madagascar

Runways
Direction	Length		Surface
Direction	m	ft	Surface
11/29	1,500	4,921	Asphalt
- Source: DAFIF

Ambilobe Airport (IATA: AMB, ICAO: FMNE) is an airport serving Ambilobe, a city in the Antsiranana province in Madagascar.

== Facilities ==
The airport resides at an elevation of 72 feet (22 m) above mean sea level. It has one runway designated 11/29 with an asphalt surface measuring 1,500 by 30 metres (4,921 ft × 98 ft).
