= Mahavavy River =

Mahavavy River (north)
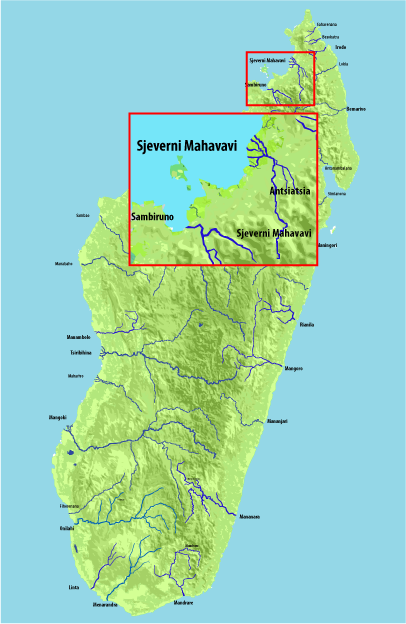
- Mahavavy (north) river system

Location
- Country: Madagascar
- Region: Diana
- Cities: Manambato, Ambilobe

Physical characteristics
- Source: at the Maromokotra peak
  - location: Tsaratanana Massif, Diana
  - elevation: 2,300 m (7,500 ft)
- Mouth: Indian Ocean
  - location: Antsohimbondrona, Diana
  - coordinates: 13°01′54″S 48°51′38″E
  - elevation: 0 m (0 ft)
- Length: 165 km (103 mi)
- Basin size: 3,300 km^{2} (1,300 sq mi)to 3,387.1 km^{2} (1,307.8 mi^{2})
- Discharge
  - location: Near mouth
  - average: (Period: 1971–2000)119.9 m^{3}/s (4,230 cu ft/s)

Basin features
- Tributaries
  - left: Antsiatsia, Ambohipato
  - right: Andranopato, Ankombe, Antsiatsia

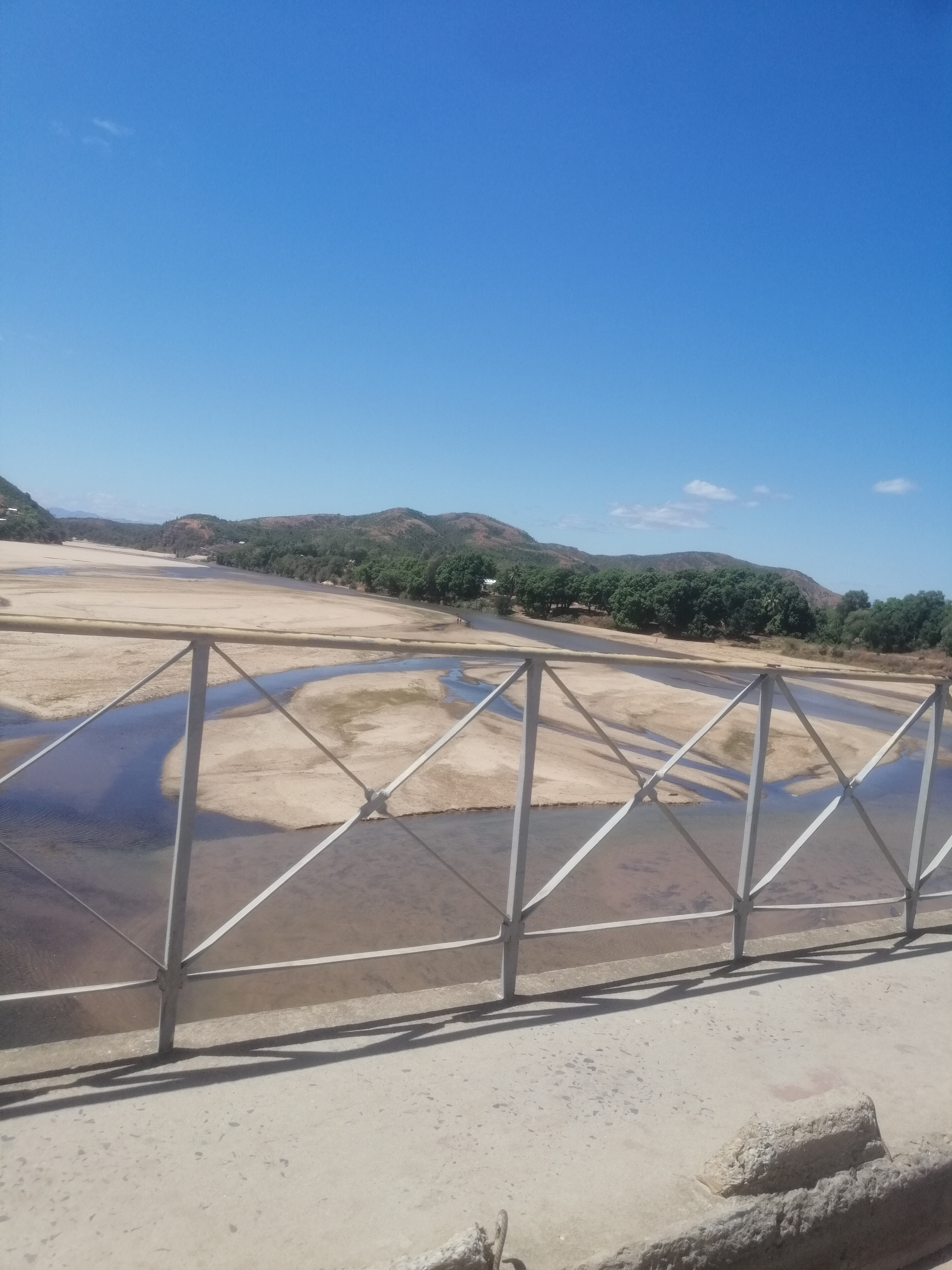
Mahavavy bridge near Ambilobe

The Mahavavy or Mahavavy-Nord River is a river of northern Madagascar in the region of Diana. It has its sources at the Maromokotra peak in the Tsaratanana Massif and flows north to the Indian Ocean. The main city along the river is Ambilobe at the National Road 6.

The bridge of this road had collapsed after the passage of cyclone Gamane in March 2024. In May local authorities held 2 jôro (traditional rites) hoping this will repair it but in June of the same year the road was still closed.

It crosses a fertile plain and the waters are used for the irrigation of 5500 ha, of mostly, cotton plantations. Its delta covers 500 km^{2}.
