= Route nationale 59b (Madagascar) =

Highway in Madagascar

Location
- Country: Madagascar

Highway system
- Roads in Madagascar

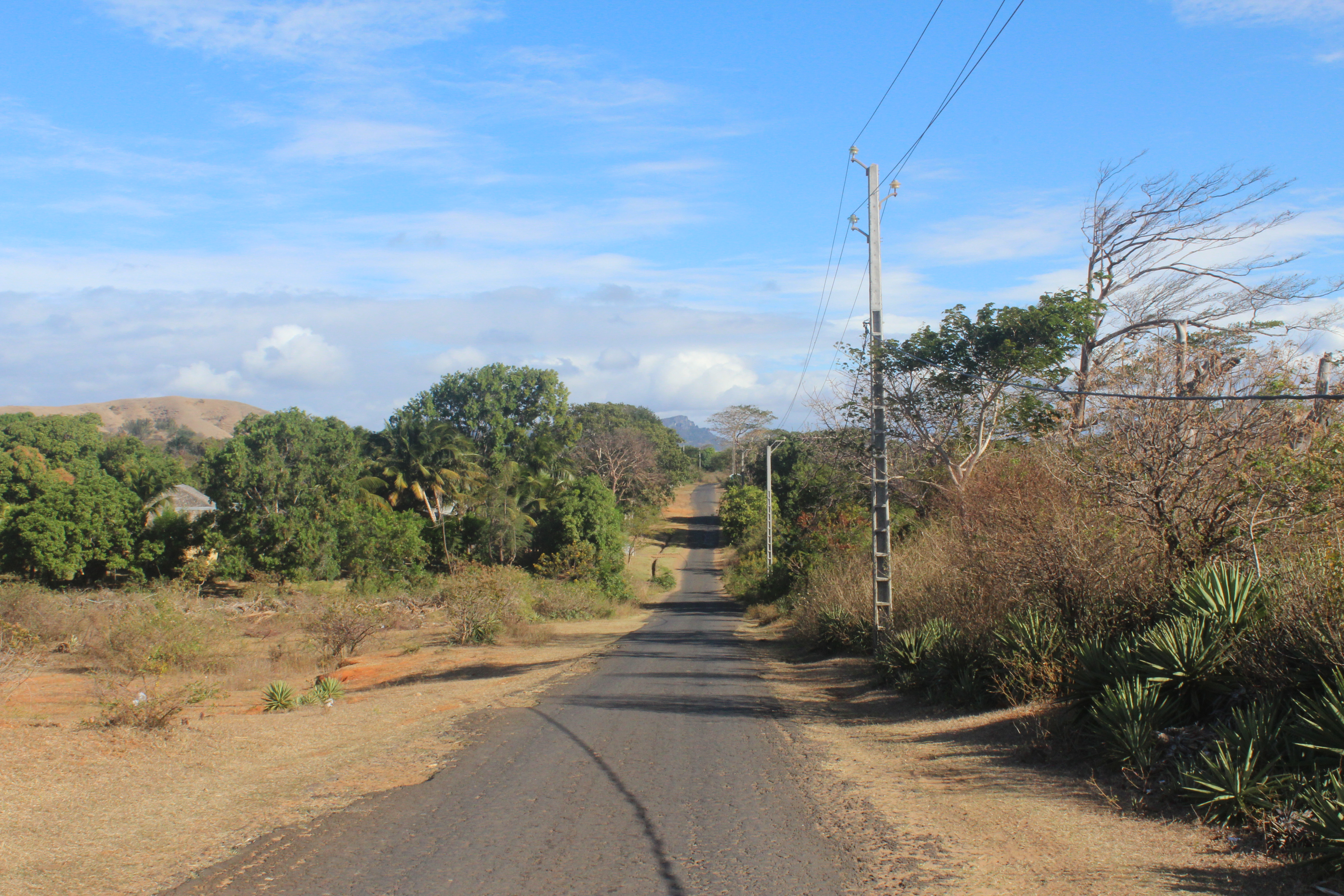
Route nationale 59b - 17.2km

Route nationale 59b (RN 59b) is a secondary highway in Madagascar, running from the intersection of RN 6 at Diego Suarez to beach village of Ramena. It is located in Diana Region and has a length of 19 km.

== See also ==
- List of roads in Madagascar
- Transport in Madagascar
