= Ramena =

Ramena Amoronjia-Orangéa
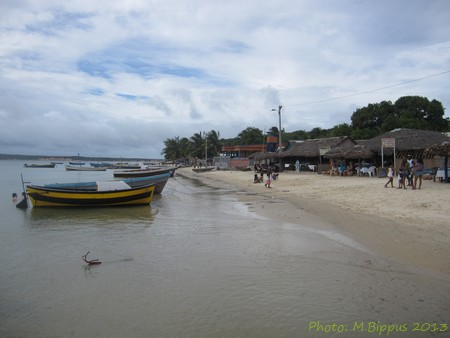

- Location in Madagascar
- Coordinates: 12°14′S 49°21′E
- Country: Madagascar
- Region: Diana
- District: Antsiranana II

Area
  - Total: 105 km^{2} (41 sq mi)
- Elevation: 44 m (144 ft)

Population (2020)
  - Total: 11,521
  - Ethnicities density: 110/km^{2} (280/sq mi)
- Time zone: UTC3 (EAT)
- Postal code: 202

Ramena is a rural municipality and a beach village in Madagascar. It belongs to the district of Antsiranana II, which is a part of Diana Region. The population of the municipality was 11521 in 2020. Only primary schooling is available.

Ramena has a popular beach of Diego Suarez, from which it can be reached by an asphalted road in a distance of 18 km.

== Economy ==
Fishing, tourism, commerce & agriculture.

== Villages (Fokontany) ==
The villages of Ramena, Ankorikahely, Ivovona, Andavakoera and Betahitra belong to the municipality. The seat & main locality is Ramena. Only Ramena and Ankorikahely are connected to the Jirama electric grid.

== Roads ==
The paved National road 59b leads to Antsiranana (Diego Suraez - 18 km).

== Bodies of Water ==
The Betahitra River and the Antsivorahana Lake.

== Localities ==
- Montagne des Français
- Ampombiantambo
