= Ambilobe =

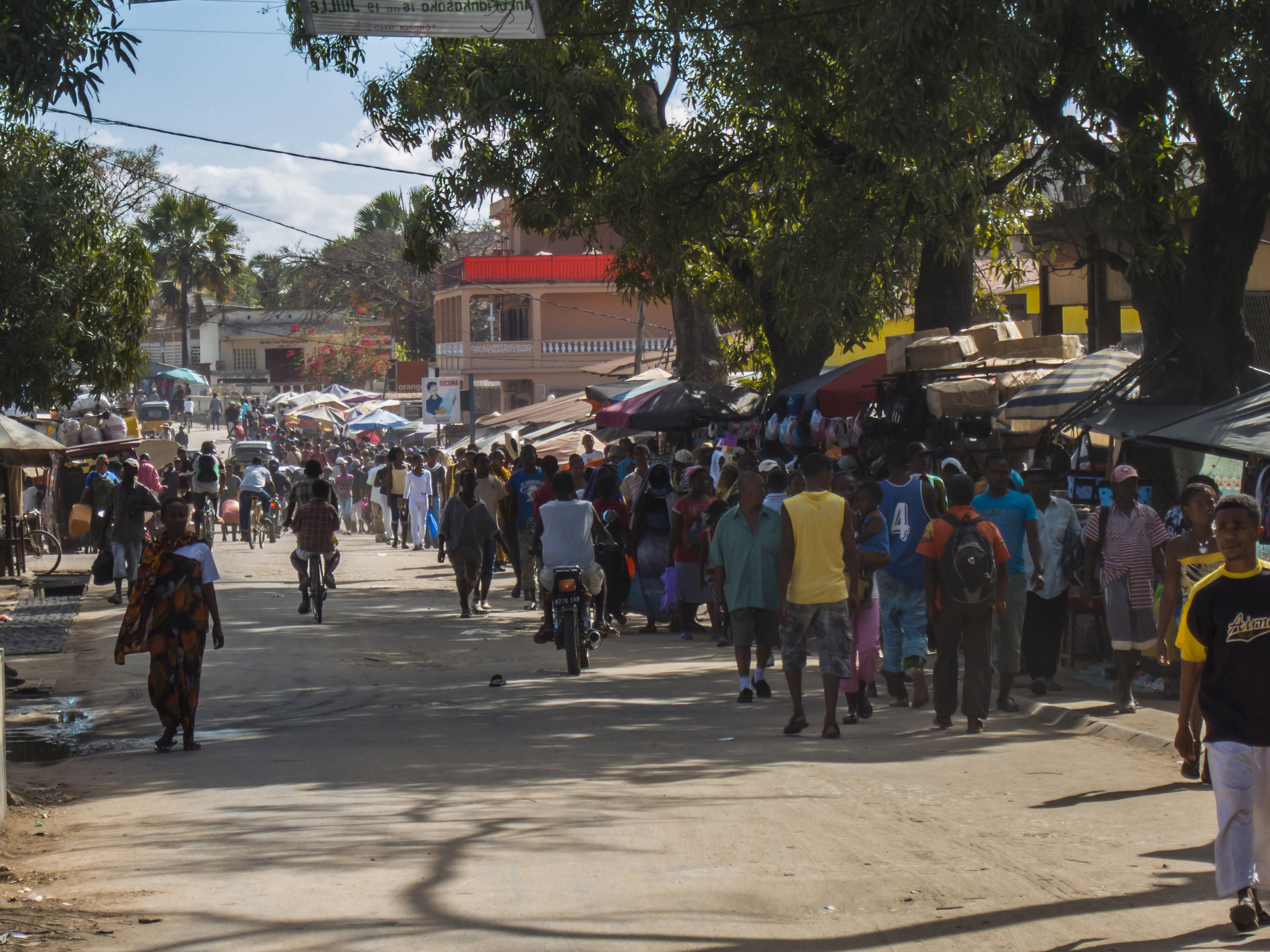
- Ambilobe

- Location in Madagascar
- Coordinates: 13°12′S 49°3′E
- Country: Madagascar
- Region: Diana
- District: Ambilobe

Government
  - Mayor: Zella Carbonel

Area
  - Land: 131 km^{2} (51 sq mi)
- Elevation: 47 m (154 ft)

Population (2018)
  - Total: 62,346
  - Density: 476/km^{2} (1,230/sq mi)
- Time zone: UTC3 (EAT)
- Postal code: 204

Ambilobe [amˌbilʷˈbe] which means "Where there are many plantations" is an urban municipality in Madagascar. It belongs to the district of Ambilobe, which is a part of Diana Region. The town is the capital of Ambilobe district, and according to 2018 census the population was approximately 62,346.

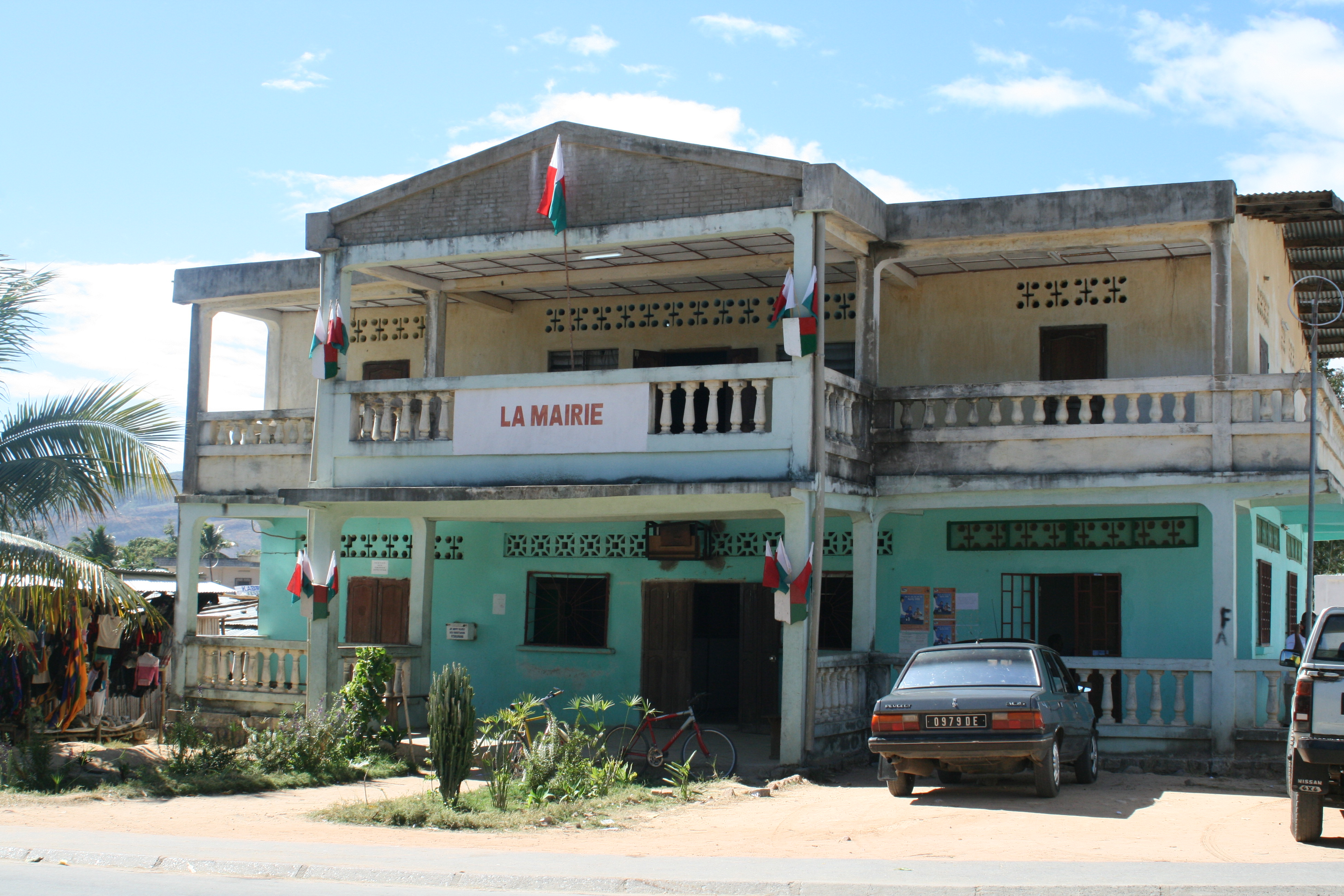
Town hall of Ambilobe

== Geography ==
It is situated at the Mahavavy River and the Route Nationale 6 at its junction with the Route Nationale 5a to the Sava region.

In addition to primary schooling the town offers secondary education at both junior and senior levels. The town provides access to hospital services to its citizens. Farming and raising livestock provides employment for 40% and 35% of the working population. The most important crop is sugarcane, while other important products are cotton, rice and tomato. Industry and services provide employment for 13% and 2% of the population, respectively. Additionally fishing employs 10% of the population.

== Airport ==
The town is served by an airport known as the Ambilobe Airport. There are no regular flights to Ambilobe.

== Economy ==
In Ambilobe is found the largest sugar mill of Madagascar (Sucoma) that produced 61.714 tons in 2018/2019.

In the village of Sangaloka that belongs to the municipality of Ambilobe, the main activity is the manufacture of ceramics.

== Notable Personalities ==
Albert Zafy, Madagascar's president from 1993 until 1996, was born in Ambilobe.

=== Climate ===
Classified as a tropical monsoon climate, occasionally also known as a tropical wet climate or tropical monsoon and trade-wind littoral climate. The Köppen Climate Classification subtype for this climate is "Am" (Tropical Monsoon Climate).

== Neighbourhoods ==
- Anoronala
- Antafiankasaka
- Antanamariazy
- Matiakoho
- Matsaborilaidama
- Tanamariazy
