= Diana Region =

Region in far northern Madagascar

- Region
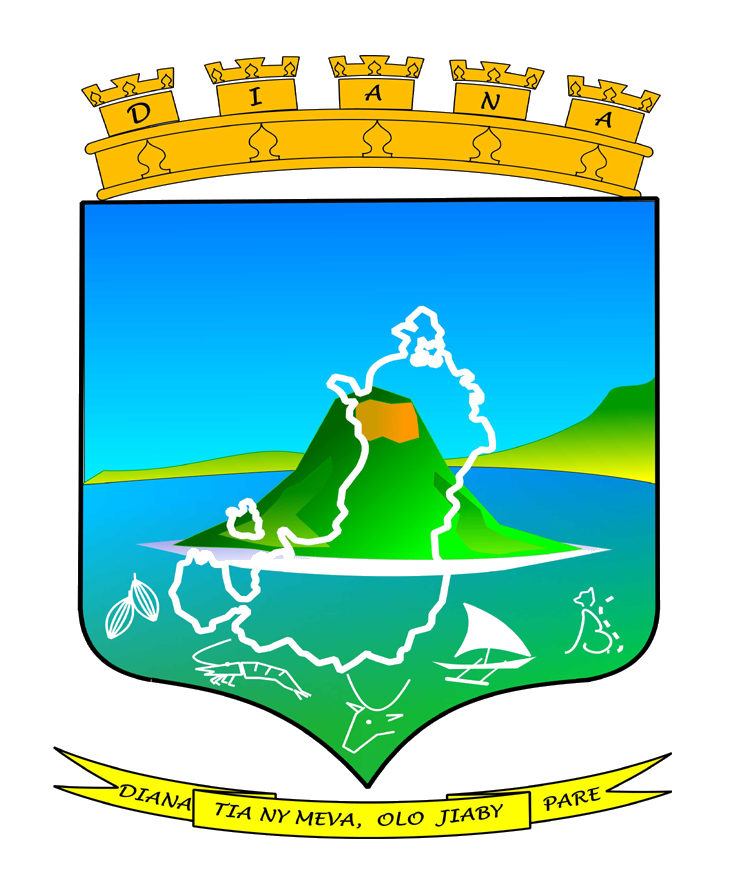
- Shield

- Location in Madagascar
- Coordinates: 12°16′12″S 49°16′48″E
- Country: Madagascar
- Capital: Antsiranana

Government
  - Gouvenor: Taciano Rakotomanga

Area
  - Total: 19,266 km^{2} (7,439 sq mi)

Population (2018)
  - Total: 889,736
  - Density: 46.182/km^{2} (119.61/sq mi)
- Time zone: UTC3 (EAT)
- HDI (2018): 0.597 medium · 2nd of 22

Diana is a region in Madagascar at the northern part of the island. It borders the regions of Sava to the southeast and Sofia to the southwest. It covers an area of 19,266 km^{2}, and had a population of 889,736 in 2018. The regional capital is Antsiranana (previously known as Diego Suarez).

== Geography ==
=== Rivers ===
The main rivers of the Diana region are:

- Besokatra River
- Irodo River
- Loky River
- Mahavavy River
- Ramena River
- Saharenana River
- Sambirano River

=== Protected areas and visitors' attractions ===
The following national parks, reserves and visitors' attractions are located in Diana:

- Ambodivahibe New Protected Area
- Andrafiamena Andavakoera New Protected Area
- Nosy Antsoha New Protected Area
- Ampasindava New Protected Area
- Galoko Kalobinono New Protected Area
- Oronjia New Protected Area
- Amber Mountain National Park
- Analamerana Reserve
- Ankarana Reserve
- Lokobe National Park
- Manongarivo Reserve
- Tsaratanana National Park
- Nosy Hara National Park
- Nosy Tanikely National Park
- Ambohitr'Antsingy (Montagne des Français) New Protected Area
- Ankarea New Protected Area
- Ankivonjy New Protected Area
- Part of COMATSA Avaratra New Protected Area
- Part of COMATSA Atsimo New Protected Area
- Tsingy Rouge

== Administrative divisions ==
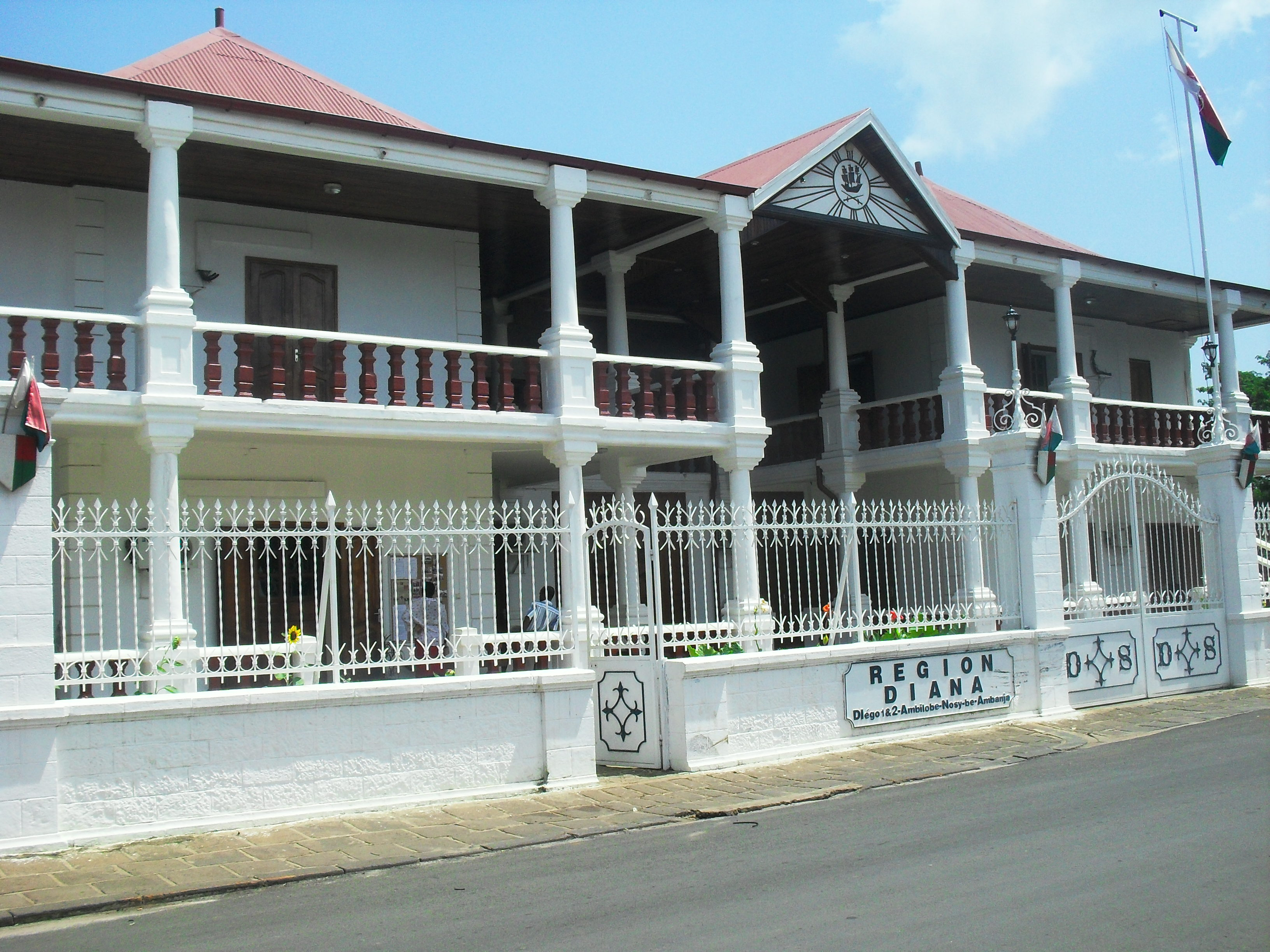
Residence Region Diana

Diana Region is divided into five districts, which are subdivided into 51 communes. The districts are listed below with their 2013 populations:

- Ambanja District - 18 communes; 190,435 inhabitants
- Ambilobe District - 15 communes; 216,145 inhabitants
- Antsiranana I District 1 commune; 115,015 inhabitants; the city of Antsiranana
- Antsiranana II District - 16 communes; 105,416 inhabitants; the rural area surrounding the city
- Nosy Be District 1 commune; 73,010 inhabitants; the island of Nosy Be

== Transport ==
- Seaports in Antsiranana and Nosy Be
- 2 regional airports, Antsiranana Airport and Nosy Be Airport
- 2 local airports in Ambanja and Ambilobe
- The region is crossed by the paved
  - Route Nationale 6 (Antsiranana - Ambilobe - Ambanja) and the unpaved
  - Route Nationale 5a from Ambilobe to Iharana as well as
  - National road 59b (Antsiranana - Ramena)

== Economy ==
=== Fishery ===
Antsiranana is an important tuna fishing port. There is also a tuna canning factory. Other important fishery products are shrimp (2.813.291 kg exported in 2002) and sea cucumber.

=== Agriculture ===
The main crops are:

- subsistence agriculture: 75.510 ha (67% of the cultivated area): rice, manioc, maize, beans, sweet potato and potato
- cash crops: 21.560 ha (19% of the cultivated area): coffee, pepper, cacao and vanilla
- industrial crops: 15.420 ha (13% of the cultivated area): sugar cane, peanuts and cotton

There are also important productions of essential oils (mainly ylang ylang but also palmarosa, vetyver and basil) on 2465 ha in the regions of Nosy Be and Ambanja.

- Cattle raising: in 2002 the region contained 308,530 bovines, 53,980 swine, 2,840 sheep and 44,520 goats.

=== Mining ===
Pozzolana, lime, gold, sapphire, graphite, lead, zinc, corundum, amethyst, garnet, zircon, cordierite, quartz, beryl and ilmenite are extracted in the region.

- Ampasindava mine, a rare earth mine.
