= Maevatanana, Diana =

Maevatanana (Diana)
- Location in Madagascar
- Coordinates: 13°53′00″S 48°32′0″E
- Country: Madagascar
- Region: Diana
- District: Ambanja
- Time zone: UTC3 (EAT)
- Postal code: 203

Maevatanana is a rural municipality in northern Madagascar, 24 km from Ambanja. It lies in the valley of the Sambirano River that is the main cocoa producing area of Madagascar. 60% or 7,500 to 10,000 ton yearly is provided by this area. There is an unpaved road from Ambanja to Marovato, via Benavony, Ambodimanga Ramena, Bemaneviky Ouest, Maevatanana that is hardly navigable. Most of the exported cocoa is therefore transported with boats on the Sambirano River.

== Infrastructure ==
Maevatana has only been connected to electricity since 2022.

hospital in Maevatanàna Ambanja
