= Ambohitrandriana =

- Location in Madagascar
- Coordinates: 13°57′03″S 48°33′8″E
- Country: Madagascar
- Region: Diana
- District: Ambanja
- Time zone: UTC3 (EAT)
- Postal code: 203

Ambohitrandriana rural municipality in northern Madagascar, in the district of Ambanja.

== Nature ==
- Tsaratanana Reserve is partly situated in this municipality.
