= Benavony =

- Location in Madagascar
- Coordinates: 13°42′S 48°29′E
- Country: Madagascar
- Region: Diana
- District: Ambanja

Area
  - Total: 5,416 km^{2} (2,091 sq mi)
- Elevation: 18 m (59 ft)
- Time zone: UTC3 (EAT)
- Postal code: 203

Benavony is a rural municipality in northern Madagascar. It belongs to the district of Ambanja, which is a part of Diana Region.

Benavony lies in the valley of the Sambirano that is the main cocoa producing area of Madagascar. 60% or 7500 to 10 000 ton yearly provide from this area. There is an unpaved piste from Ambanja to Marovato, via Benavony, Ambodimanga Ramena, Bemaneviky Ouest, Maevatanana that is hardly practicable. Most of the exported cocoa is therefore transported with boats on the Sambirano River.
