= Bemaneviky Ouest =

- Location in Madagascar
- Coordinates: 13°50′S 48°30′E
- Country: Madagascar
- Region: Diana
- District: Ambanja
- Elevation: 32 m (105 ft)

Population (2018)
  - Total: 5,841
- Time zone: UTC3 (EAT)

Bemaneviky Ouest is a municipality (French: commune, Malagasy: kaominina) in Madagascar. It belongs to the district of Ambanja, which is a part of Diana Region. According to 2018 census the population was 5,841.

== Location ==
Bemaneviky Ouest lies on the banks of the Sambirano River, between Manongarivo Reserve and Ankarana Reserve. The valley of the Sambirano is the main cocoa producing area of Madagascar. 60% or 7500 to 10 000 ton yearly provide from this area.

There is an unpaved piste from Ambanja to Marovato, via Benavony, Ambodimanga Ramena, Bemaneviky Ouest, Maevatanana that is hardly practicable. Most of the exported cocoa is therefore transported with boats on the Sambirano River.

== Education ==
Primary and junior level secondary education are available in town. The majority 50% of the population works in fishing. 49% are farmers. The most important crop is coffee, while other important products are seeds of catechu and pepper. Services provide employment for 1% of the population.
