= Ambodimanga, Ambanja =

Ambodimanga
- Location in Madagascar
- Coordinates: 13°47′S 48°37′E
- Country: Madagascar
- Region: Diana
- District: Ambanja

Area
  - Total: 1,216 km^{2} (470 sq mi)
- Elevation: 373 m (1,224 ft)

Population (2001)
  - Total: 5,729
- Time zone: UTC3 (EAT)
- Postal code: 203

Bridge in Ambodimanga Andoharano-Ambanja

Ambodimanga (or Ambodimanga Ramena) is a municipality (French: commune, Malagasy: kaominina) in Madagascar. It belongs to the district of Ambanja, which is a part of Diana Region. According to 2001 census the population of Ambodimanga was 5,729.

Only primary schooling is available in town. The majority 99.5% of the population are farmers. The most important crop is coffee, while other important products are cocoa, beans and rice. Services provide employment for 0.5% of the population.

== Rivers ==
Ambodimanga is situated at the Ramena River, at its outlet to the Sambirano River. The valley of the Sambirano is the main cocoa producing area of Madagascar. 60% or 7500 to 10 000 ton yearly provide from this area. There is an unpaved piste from Ambanja to Marovato, via Benavony, Ambodimanga Ramena, Bemaneviky Ouest, Maevatanana that is hardly practicable. Most of the exported cocoa is therefore transported with boats on the Sambirano River.
