= Jean David Baba =

Malagasy politician

Jean David Baba is a Malagasy politician. A member of the National Assembly of Madagascar, he was elected as a member of the Tiako I Madagasikara party; he represents the constituency of Ambanja.
