= Sambirano River =

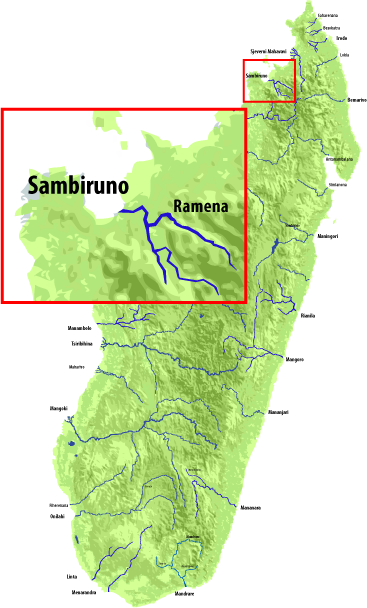
- Tsaratanana Massif river system

Location
- Country: Madagascar
- Region: Diana
- City: Ambanja

Physical characteristics
- Source: at the Maromokotra peak
  - location: Tsaratanana Massif, Diana
  - elevation: 2,500 m (8,200 ft)
- Mouth: Indian Ocean
  - location: Diana
  - coordinates: 13°37′02″S 48°20′01″E
  - elevation: 0 m (0 ft)
- Length: 124 km (77 mi)
- Basin size: 2,800 km^{2} (1,100 sq mi)to 2,979.4 km^{2} (1,150.4 mi^{2})
- Discharge
  - location: Near mouth
  - average: (Period: 1971–2000)134.6 m^{3}/s (4,750 cu ft/s)

Basin features
- River system: Sambirano River
- Tributaries
  - right: Ramena

The Sambirano is a river of northwestern Madagascar in the region of Diana. It has its sources at the Maromokotra peak and flows through the Tsaratanana Reserve to the Indian Ocean. Its delta occupies 250 km^{2}.

The ecosystem of the river, mainly forests and brushland, has many indigenous species, such as the Sambirano mouse lemur and Sambirano woolly lemur.

The Madagascar dry deciduous forests occupy much of the river basin, although mangroves are evident at parts of the coastal fringe.

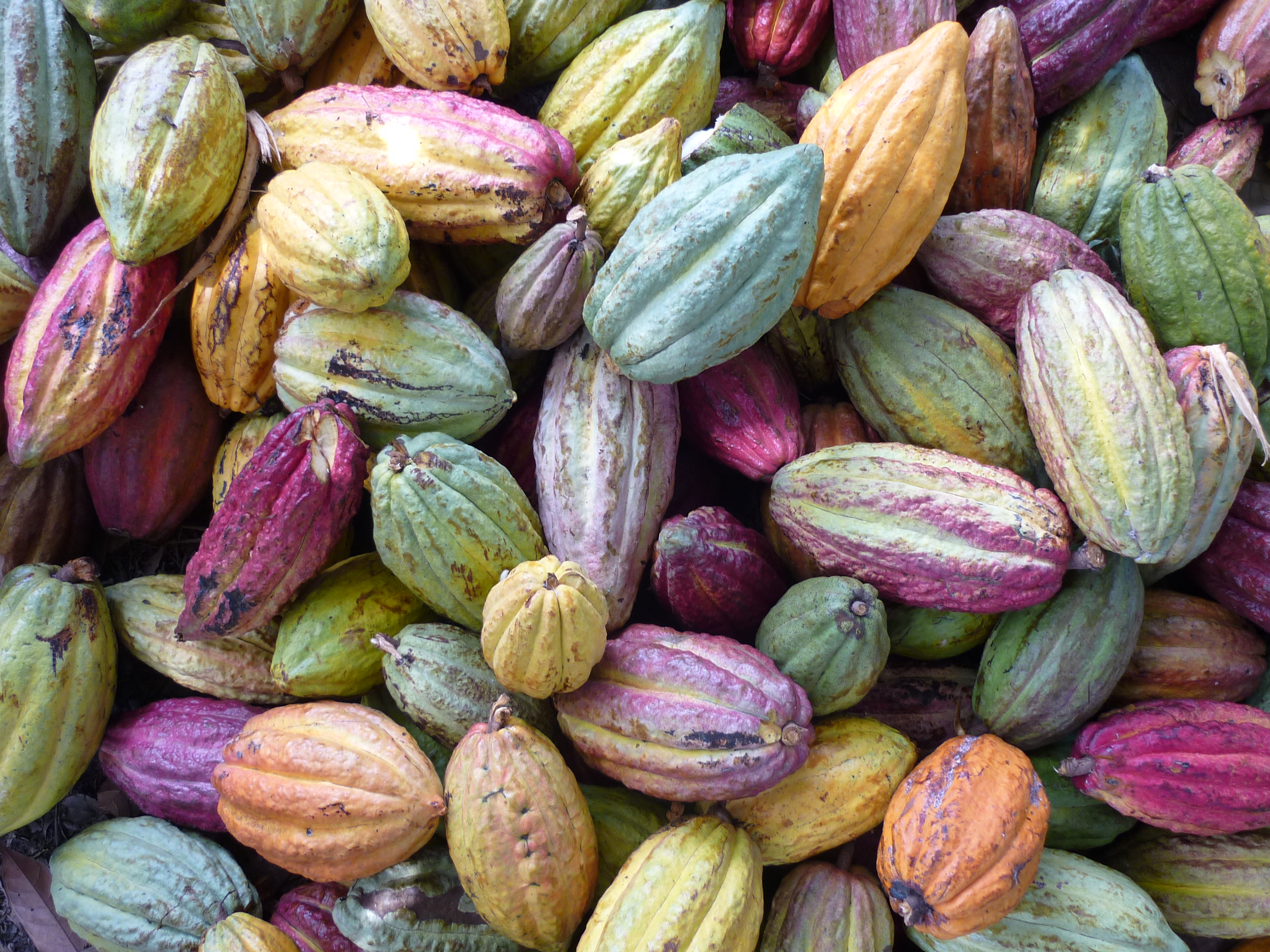
Cocoa fruits from Madagascar

The valley of the Sambirano is the main cocoa producing area of Madagascar. 60% (or 7500 to 10 000 tons yearly) provide from this area. There is an unpaved piste from Ambanja to Marovato, via Benavony, Ambodimanga Ramena, Bemaneviky Ouest, Maevatanana that is hardly practicable. Most of the exported cocoa is therefore transported with boats on the Sambirano river to Ambanja and the National road 6
