= Ambohimena =

- Location in Madagascar
- Coordinates: 13°57′S 48°25′E
- Country: Madagascar
- Region: Diana
- District: Ambanja
- Elevation: 15 m (49 ft)
- Time zone: UTC3 (EAT)
- Postal code: 203

Ambohimena is a rural municipality in northern Madagascar. It belongs to the district of Ambanja, which is a part of Diana Region.
