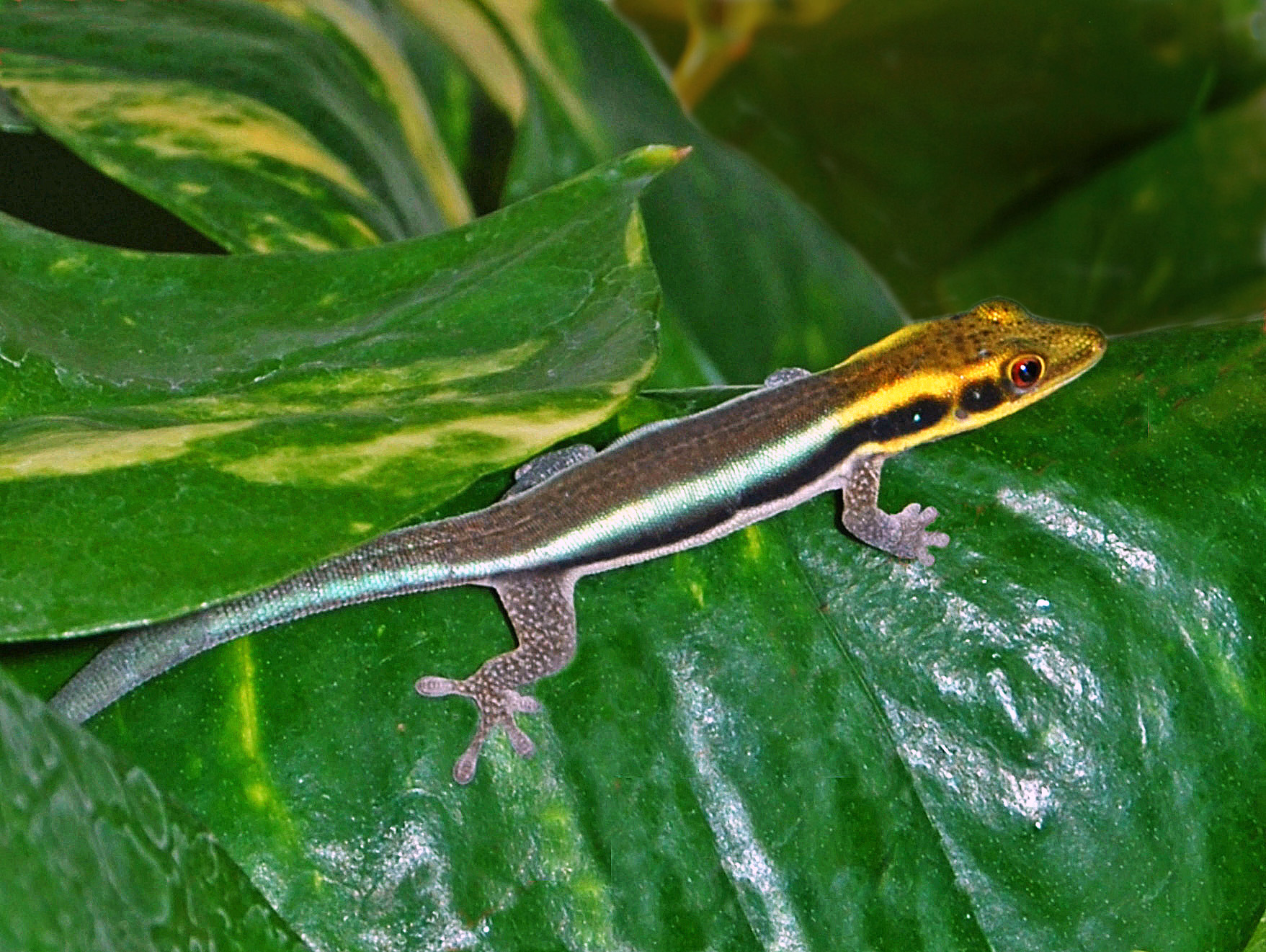

Conservation status
- Endangered (IUCN 3.1)

Scientific classification
- Kingdom: Animalia
- Phylum: Chordata
- Class: Reptilia
- Order: Squamata
- Suborder: Gekkota
- Family: Gekkonidae
- Genus: Phelsuma
- Species: P. klemmeri

Binomial name
- Phelsuma klemmeri Seipp, 1991
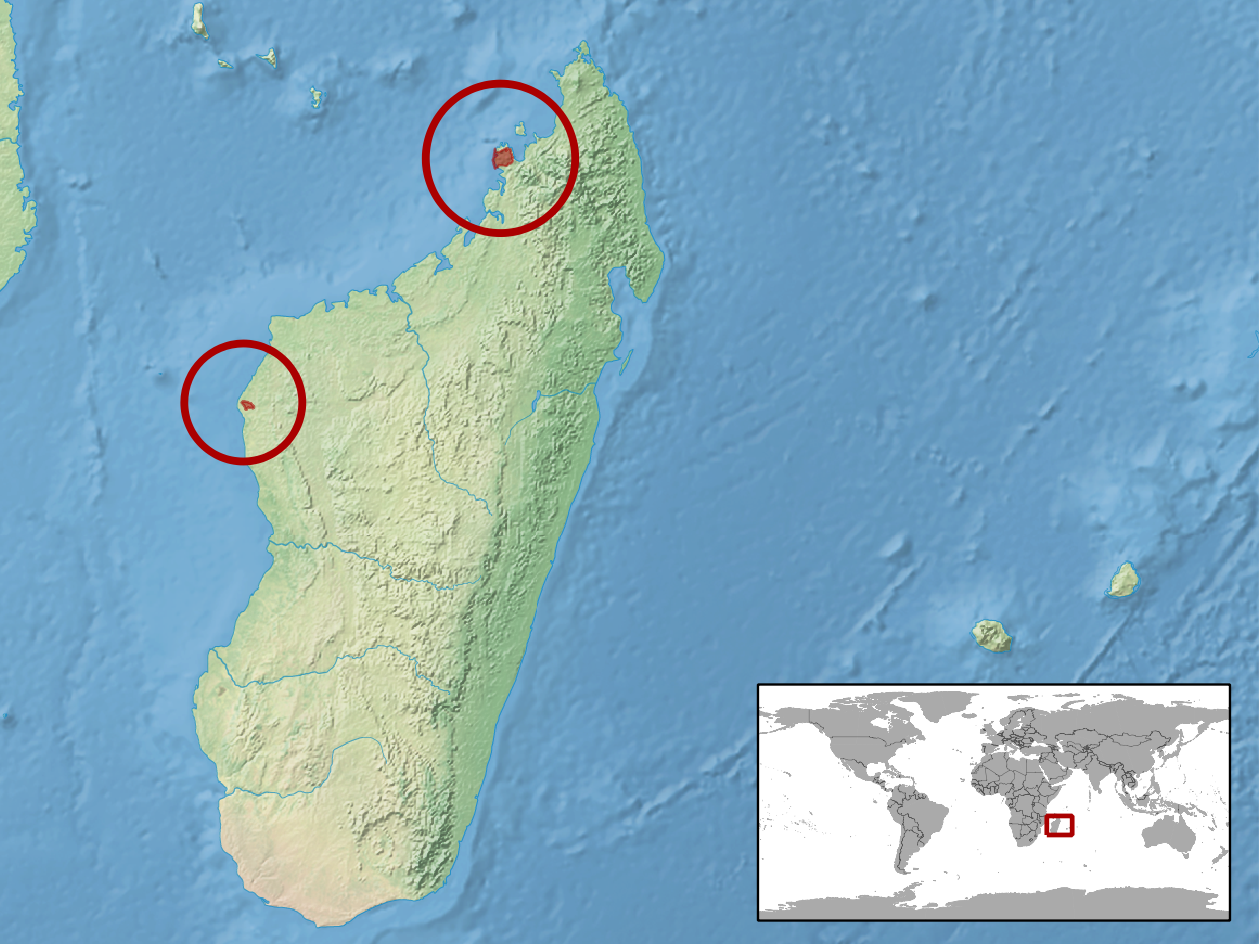

= Yellow-headed day gecko =

Species of lizard

The yellow-headed day gecko (Phelsuma klemmeri), also commonly called the cheerful day gecko, Klemmer's day gecko, and the neon day gecko, is a small diurnal species of gecko, a lizard in the family Gekkonidae. This endangered species is endemic to northwestern Madagascar and inhabits coastal forests (both dry and humid), dwelling on bamboo. The yellow-headed day gecko feeds on insects and nectar.

== Etymology ==
The specific name, klemmeri, is in honor of German herpetologist Konrad Klemmer.

== Description ==
P. klemmeri is small, reaching a total length (including tail) of 3.25–3.75 in (8.3–9.5 cm). The body colour of this slender and long-snouted gecko is turquoise blue at the upper and mid-back. The lower back is light brown. Most of the tail is turquoise blue. Remarkable is the laterally flattened body. Another typical characteristic is the yellow head. A dark black spot is present behind the eye, followed by a black stripe which extends to the rear extremities. The legs and toes are brown speckled. The ventral side is grayish white. The sexes can easily be distinguished by the orange color around the femoral pores of the males.

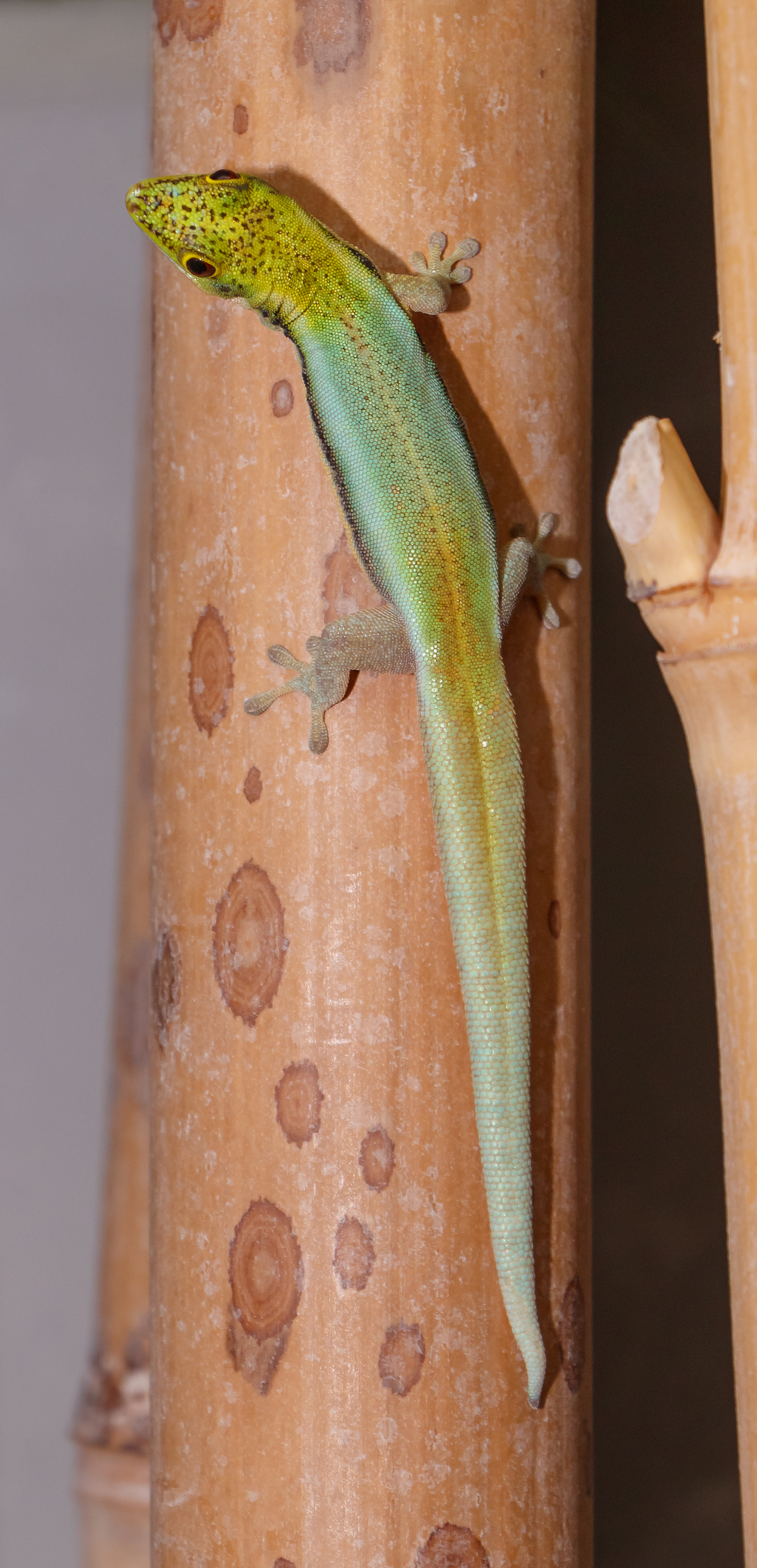
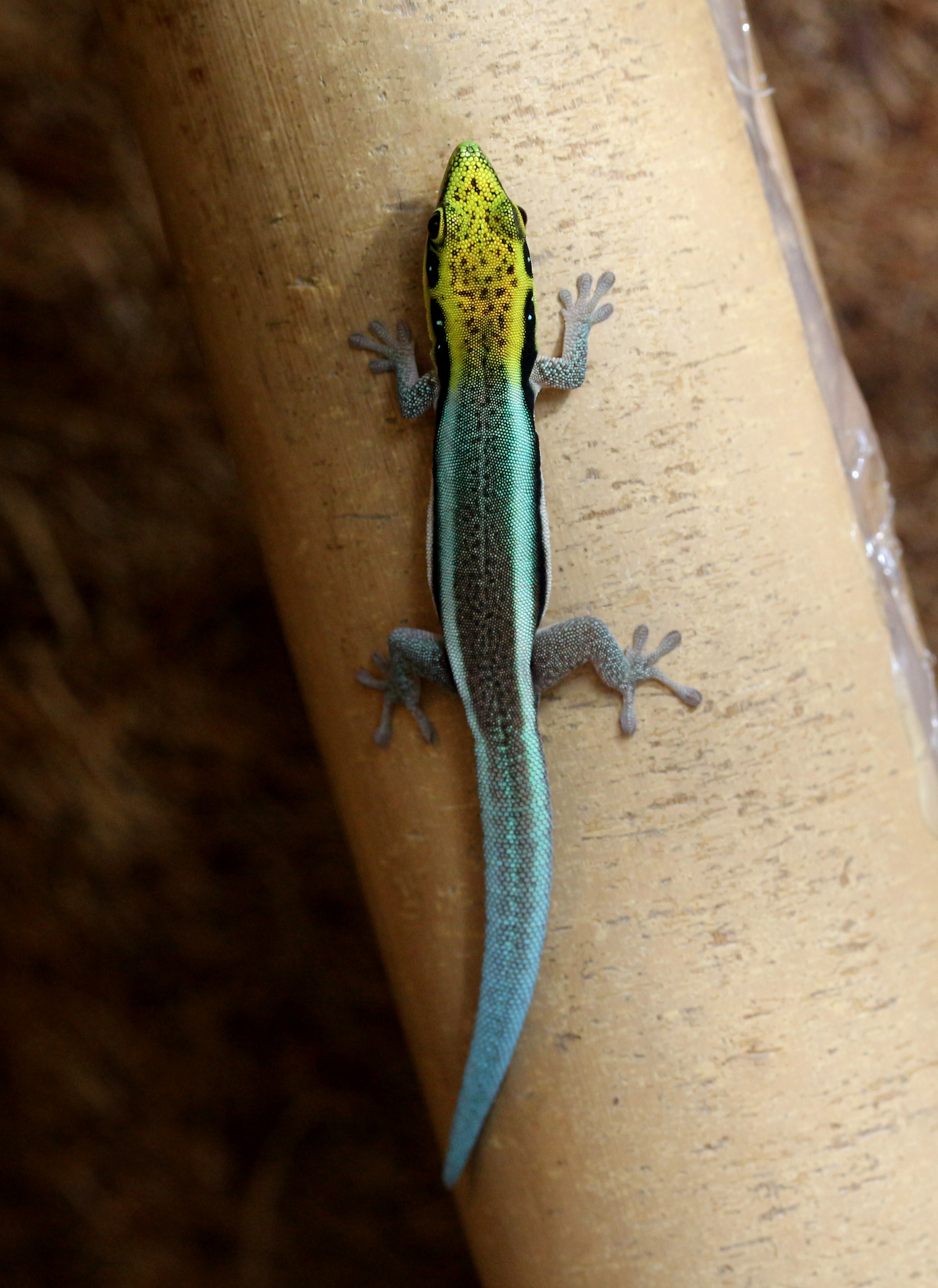
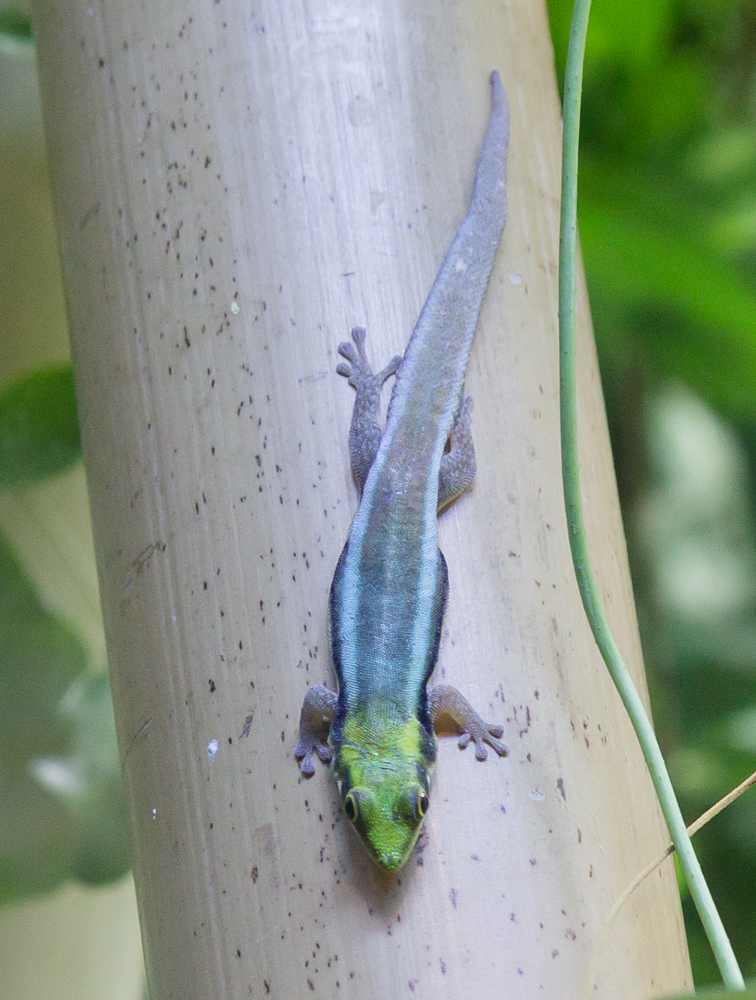
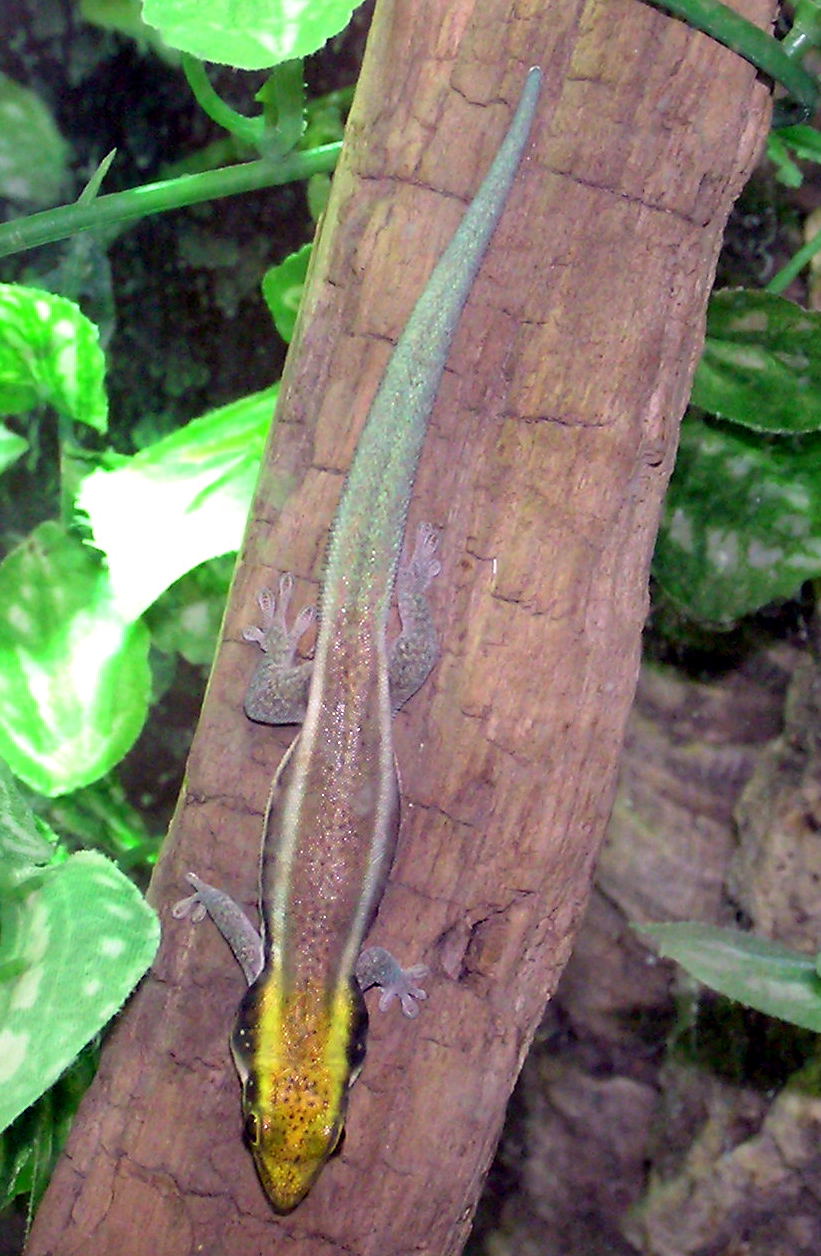

== Geographic range ==
P. klemmeri inhabits northwest Madagascar, along the coast. It is only known from the Ampasindava Peninsula (at Antsatsaka) and near Mandrozo Lake.

== Habitat ==
P. klemmeri typically lives in bamboo forest, at altitudes up to 400 m (1,300 ft). It sometimes shares its habitat with P. seippi and P. madagascarienis grandis. P. klemmeri is most commonly found on yellow bamboo canes, but may be found on green bamboo or other nearby foliage. When threatened, P. klemmeri will hide inside narrow cracks in the bamboo.

== Diet ==
P. klemmeri feeds on various insects and other invertebrates. It also likes to lick soft sweet fruit, pollen, and nectar.

== Behaviour ==
P. klemmeri is primarily active during the cooler part of the day (diurnal) and likes to bask. It often lives in small groups.

== Reproduction ==
P. klemmeri is oviparous. The female lays a pair of eggs and hides them in bamboo canes. At a temperature of 27 °C (80.6 °F), the young will hatch after approximately 39–52 days. Each juvenile measures 22–29 mm (0.87–1.14 in).

== Captivity ==
The species P. klemmeri is bred extensively in captivity, and the IUCN thinks it unlikely that it is still wild-caught.

When well cared-for, this species may live for up to 15 years.
