= Antsirabe, Ambanja =

Antsirabe
- Location in Madagascar
- Coordinates: 13°52′S 48°12′E
- Country: Madagascar
- Region: Diana
- District: Ambanja
- Elevation: 144 m (472 ft)

Population (2001)
  - Total: 3,405
- Time zone: UTC3 (EAT)

Antsirabe is a town and commune (Malagasy: kaominina) in Madagascar. It belongs to the district of Ambanja, which is a part of Diana Region. According to 2001 commune census the population of Antsirabe was 3,405.

Only primary schooling is available in town. The majority 90% of the population are farmers, while an additional 1.5% receives their livelihood from raising livestock. The most important crops are rice and coffee, while other important agricultural products are seeds of catechu and pepper. Services provide employment for 0.5% of the population. Additionally fishing employs 8% of the population.
