= Antsakoamanondro =

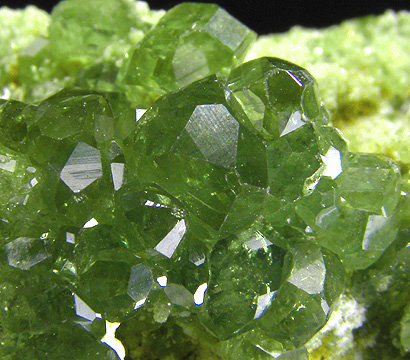
- Andradites from Antetezambato mines

- Location in Madagascar
- Coordinates: 13°37′S 48°30′E
- Country: Madagascar
- Region: Diana
- District: Ambanja
- Elevation: 56 m (184 ft)

Population (2001)
  - Total: 5,622
- Time zone: UTC3 (EAT)

Antsakoamanondro is a municipality (French: commune, Malagasy: kaominina) in Madagascar. It belongs to the district of Ambanja, which is a part of Diana Region. According to 2001 census the population of Antsakoamanondro was 5,622.

Primary and junior level secondary education are available in town. The majority 98% of the population are farmers. The most important crop is rice, while other important products are coffee, seeds of catechu and oranges. Services provide employment for 0.02% of the population and fishing employs 1.98% of the population.

In the village of Antetezambato that is part of this municipality, there are important demantoid and amethyst mines.
