= Djangoa =

- Location in Madagascar
- Coordinates: 13°47′S 48°19′E
- Country: Madagascar
- Region: Diana
- District: Ambanja
- Elevation: 12 m (39 ft)

Population (2001)
  - Total: 9,800
- Time zone: UTC3 (EAT)

Djangoa is a municipality (French: commune, Malagasy: kaominina) in Madagascar. It belongs to the district of Ambanja, which is a part of Diana Region. According to 2001 census the population of Djangoa was 9,800.

Primary and junior level secondary education are available in town. The majority 50% of the population works in fishing. 49% are farmers. The most important crop is coffee, while other important products are seeds of catechu and pepper. Services provide employment for 1% of the population.
