= Nosy Faly =

Island of Madagascar

Geography
- Coordinates: 13°20′S 48°29′E
- Area: 14 km^{2} (5.4 sq mi)

Nosy Faly is an island just off the north west coast of Madagascar. It is located in the Mozambique Channel, east of the island of Nosy Be. It is part of the commune of Antafiambotry and the Ambanja District.
