= Maherivaratra =

- Location in Madagascar
- Coordinates: 13°30′S 48°40′E
- Country: Madagascar
- Region: Diana
- District: Ambanja
- Elevation: 15 m (49 ft)

Population (2001)
  - Total: 4,151
- Time zone: UTC3 (EAT)

Maherivaratra is a municipality (French: commune, Malagasy: kaominina) in Madagascar. It belongs to the district of Ambanja, which is a part of Diana Region. According to the 2001 census, the population of Maherivaratra was 4,151.

Maherivaratra is served by a local airport. Only primary schooling is available in town. The majority 59% of the population are farmers. The most important crop is the seeds of catechu, while other important products are coffee and rice. Services provide employment for 1% and fishing employs 40% of the population.
