= Bemanevika Haut Sambirano =

Bemaneviky Haut Sambirano
- Location in Madagascar
- Coordinates: 13°39′S 48°02′E
- Country: Madagascar
- Region: Diana
- District: Ambanja
- Elevation: 15 m (49 ft)

Population (2018)
  - Total: 11,355
- Time zone: UTC3 (EAT)

Bemaneviky Haut Sambirano is a municipality (French: commune, Malagasy: kaominina) in Madagascar. It belongs to the district of Ambanja, which is a part of Diana Region. According to 2018 census the population was 11,355.

Primary and junior level secondary education are available in town. The majority 50% of the population works in fishing. 49% are farmers. The most important crop is coffee, while other important products are seeds of catechu and pepper. Services provide employment for 1% of the population.
