= Ankingameloko =

- Location in Madagascar
- Coordinates: 13°49′S 48°17′E
- Country: Madagascar
- Region: Diana
- District: Ambanja
- Elevation: 23 m (75 ft)

Population (2001)
  - Total: 6,018
- Time zone: UTC3 (EAT)

Ankingameloko is a municipality (French: commune, Malagasy: kaominina) in Madagascar. It belongs to the district of Ambanja, which is a part of Diana Region. According to 2001 census the population of Ankingameloko was 6,018.

Only primary schooling is available in town. The majority 95% of the population are farmers. The most important crops are coffee and pepper; also seeds of catechu is an important agricultural product. Services provide employment for 1% of the population. Additionally fishing employs 4% of the population.
