= A. catechu =

A. catechu may refer to:

- Acacia catechu, the mimosa catechu, a deciduous thorny tree species
- Areca catechu, the areca palm or areca nut palm, a species of palm species found in much of the tropical Pacific
