= Antranokarany =

- Location in Madagascar
- Coordinates: 13°43′S 48°24′E
- Country: Madagascar
- Region: Diana
- District: Ambanja
- Elevation: 18 m (59 ft)

Population (2001)
  - Total: 7,221
- Time zone: UTC3 (EAT)

Antranokarany is a municipality (French: commune, Malagasy: kaominina) in Madagascar. It belongs to the district of Ambanja, which is a part of the Diana Region. According to a 2001 census, the population of Antranokarany was 7,221.

Only primary schooling is available in town. The majority of the population (96%) are farmers. The most important crop is coffee, while other important products are cocoa and rice. Services provide employment for 1% of the population and fishing employs 3% of the population.
