= Mahamanina Falls =

Waterfall in Madagascar

- Location within Madagascar
- Location: Ambanja, Diana, Madagascar
- Coordinates: 14°08′00″S 48°45′00″E
- Total height: 60 m (200 ft)
- Watercourse: Mirahavavyse River

The Mahamanina Falls is a 60-meter-high (200 ft) waterfall in the region of Diana in the north of Madagascar. It is located 15 km from Ambanja via Route nationale 6. Two more falls are situated on the Mirahavavyse River at 14 km on the road to Sambirano.

== See also ==
- List of waterfalls
