= Ankatafa =

- Location in Madagascar
- Coordinates: 13°37′S 48°22′E
- Country: Madagascar
- Region: Diana
- District: Ambanja
- Elevation: 10 m (33 ft)

Population (2001)
  - Total: 8,652
- Time zone: UTC3 (EAT)

Ankatafa is a municipality (French: commune, Malagasy: kaominina) in Madagascar. It belongs to the district of Ambanja, which is a part of Diana Region. According to 2001 census the population of Ankatafa was 8,652.

Ankatafa has a harbour, and primary and junior level secondary education are available in town. The majority 98% of the population are farmers. The most important crop is coffee, while other important products are cocoa and rice. Services provide employment for 2% of the population.
