= Anorotsangana =

- Location in Madagascar
- Coordinates: 13°55′S 47°55′E
- Country: Madagascar
- Region: Diana
- District: Ambanja
- Elevation: 25 m (82 ft)

Population (2001)
  - Total: 5,250
- Time zone: UTC3 (EAT)

Anorotsangana is a municipality (French: commune, Malagasy: kaominina) in north-western Madagascar over the Mozambique Channel. It is some 250 kilometres south of Antsiranana. It belongs to the district of Ambanja, which is a part of Diana Region. According to 2001 census the population of Anorotsangana was 5,250.

Only primary schooling is available in town. Farming and raising livestock provides employment for 40% and 21.3% of the working population. The most important crops are coffee and coconut, while other important agricultural products are pepper and rice. Industry and services provide employment for 0.5% and 0.2% of the population, respectively. Additionally fishing employs 38% of the population.
