= Ramena River =

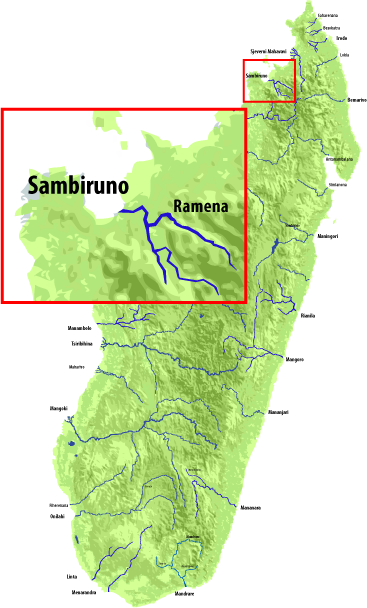
- Tsaratanana Massif river system

Location
- Country: Madagascar
- Region: Diana

Physical characteristics
- Source: at the Maromokotra peak
  - location: Tsaratanana Massif, Diana
  - elevation: 2,500 m (8,200 ft)
- Mouth: Ambodimanga, Sambirano River
  - location: Diana
  - coordinates: 13°44′S 48°37′E
  - elevation: 27 m (89 ft)
- Length: 86.2 km (53.6 mi)
- Basin size: 1,080 km^{2} (420 sq mi)

The Ramena River is a river of northwestern Madagascar in the region of Diana. It has its sources at the Maromokotra and is the main affluent of the Sambirano River. Its outlet is situated at Ambodimanga Ramena.
