= Ambohimarina =

- Location in Madagascar
- Coordinates: 13°56′S 48°28′E
- Country: Madagascar
- Region: Diana
- District: Ambanja
- Elevation: 427 m (1,401 ft)

Population (2001)
  - Total: 7,000
- Time zone: UTC3 (EAT)

Ambohimarina is a town and commune (Malagasy: kaominina) in northern Madagascar. It belongs to the district of Ambanja, which is a part of Diana Region. The population of the commune was estimated to be approximately 7,000 as of the 2001 census.

The majority (95%) of the population of the commune are farmers. The most important crop is cocoa, while other important products are coffee and rice. Services provide employment for 5% of the population.
