= Tsaratanana Reserve =

Protected area in Madagascar

- IUCN category Ia (strict nature reserve)
- Location within Madagascar
- Location: Diana Region, Madagascar
- Coordinates: 13.963°S 48.849°E
- Area: 486.22 km^{2} (187.73 sq mi)
- Designated: 31 December 1927
- Website: www.parcs-madagascar.com/parcs/tsaratanana.php

Tsaratanana Reserve is a national park of Madagascar. The park is located at a high elevation. The park provides a significant amount of water to the area, and many rivers exist in the area, such as the Bemarivo River, Sambirano River and the Ramena or Mahavavy River. The park also has two waterfalls and thermal baths.

It includes Maromokotro peak which is the highest mountain of Madagascar at 2,876 m (9,436 ft)

The forests in the park are threatened with illegal logging due to obtaining areas for illegal cultivation of marijuana, vanilla and rice.

== Geography ==
It is located 57 km (35 mi) north of Bealanana in the Diana Region.

The park covers an area of 48,622 ha.

== Flora and fauna ==
Most of the park is in the Madagascar subhumid forests ecoregion. Some high-elevation areas are in the Madagascar ericoid thickets ecoregion.

The park is home to animal species that cannot be found anywhere else in the world, including at least four species of endangered frogs: Rhombophryne guentherpetersi, Rhombophryne ornata, Rhombophryne tany, and Cophyla alticola.
