= Antsatsaka =

- Location in Madagascar
- Coordinates: 13°42′S 48°22′E
- Country: Madagascar
- Region: Diana
- District: Ambanja
- Elevation: 15 m (49 ft)

Population (2001)
  - Total: 10,214
- Time zone: UTC3 (EAT)

Antsatsaka is a municipality (French: commune, Malagasy: kaominina) in Madagascar. It belongs to the district of Ambanja, which is a part of Diana Region. According to 2001 census the population of Antsatsaka was 10,214.

Primary and junior level secondary education are available in town. The majority 98% of the population are farmers. The most important crop is cocoa, while other important products are banana, coffee and oranges. Additionally fishing employs 2% of the population.
