= Maromokotro =

Highest mountain in Madagascar

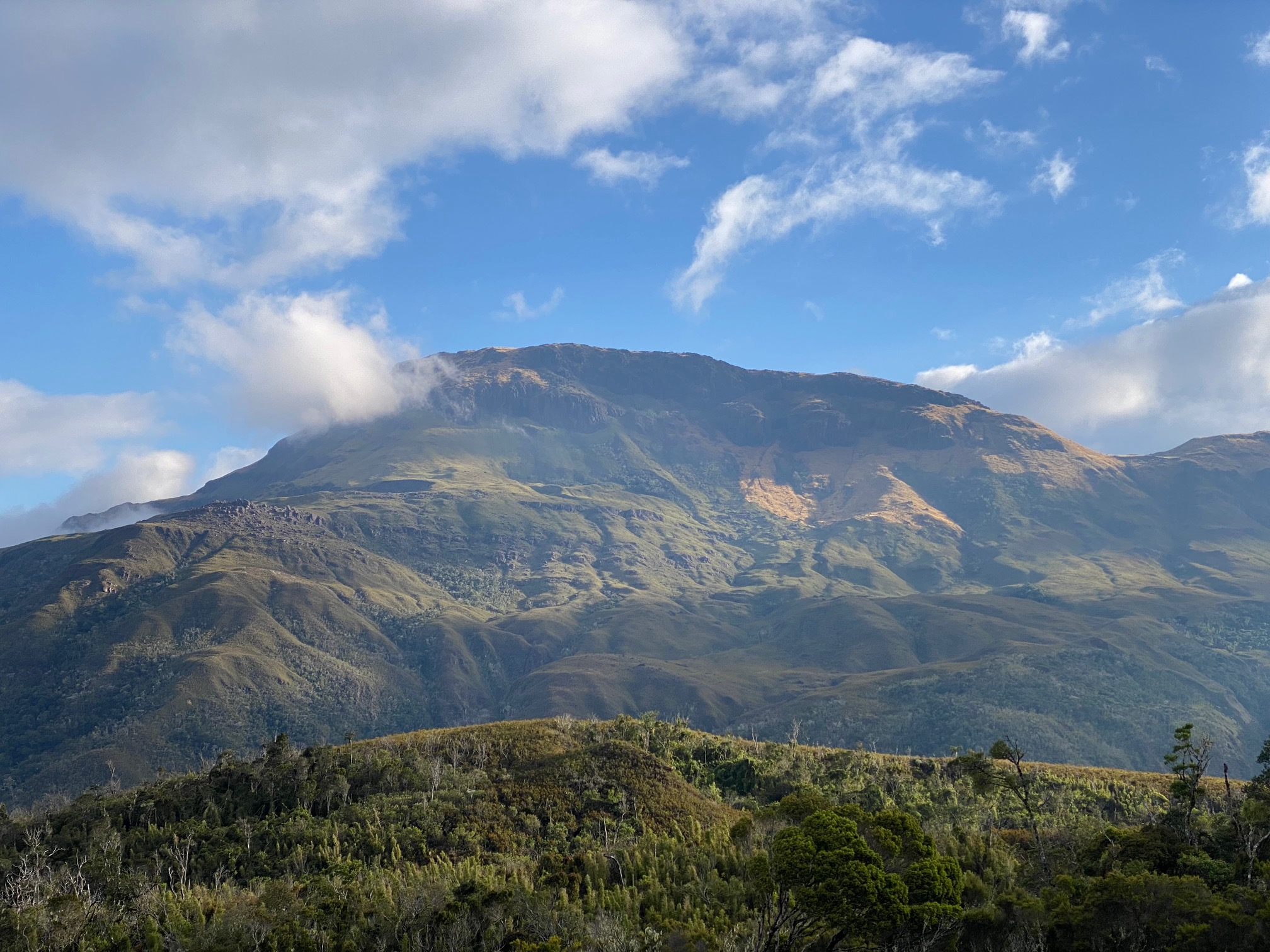

Highest point
- Elevation: 2,876 m (9,436 ft)
- Prominence: 2,876 m (9,436 ft); Ranked 114th
- Listing: Country high point Island high point Ultra
- Coordinates: 14°01′24″S 48°57′57″E

Naming
- Language of name: Malagasy

Geography
- Location within Madagascar
- Location: Madagascar

Geology
- Mountain type: Volcano

Maromokotro or Maromokotra is a volcano in Madagascar. At 2,876 meters (9,436 ft), it is the highest peak on the island. It is located in the Tsaratanana Massif inside the Tsaratanana Reserve in Diana Region in the northern part of the island.
