= Ambanja District =

- District
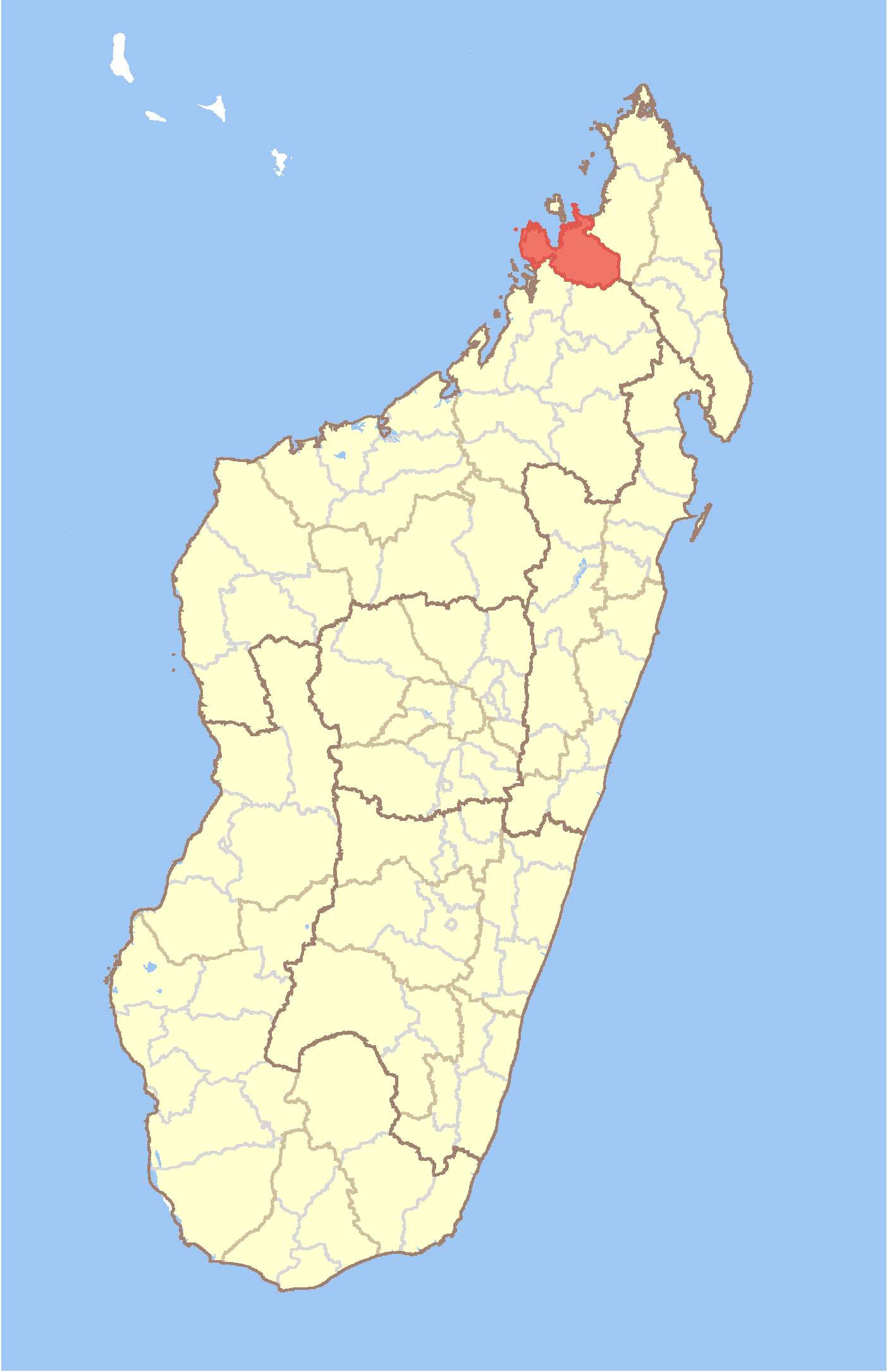
- Location in Madagascar
- Coordinates: 13°40′43″S 48°27′8″E
- Country: Madagascar
- Region: Diana

Area
  - Total: 5,999.72 km^{2} (2,316.50 sq mi)

Population (2013)
  - Total: 190,435
  - Density: 31.7406/km^{2} (82.2079/sq mi)
  - Ethnicities: Sakalava
- Time zone: UTC3 (EAT)

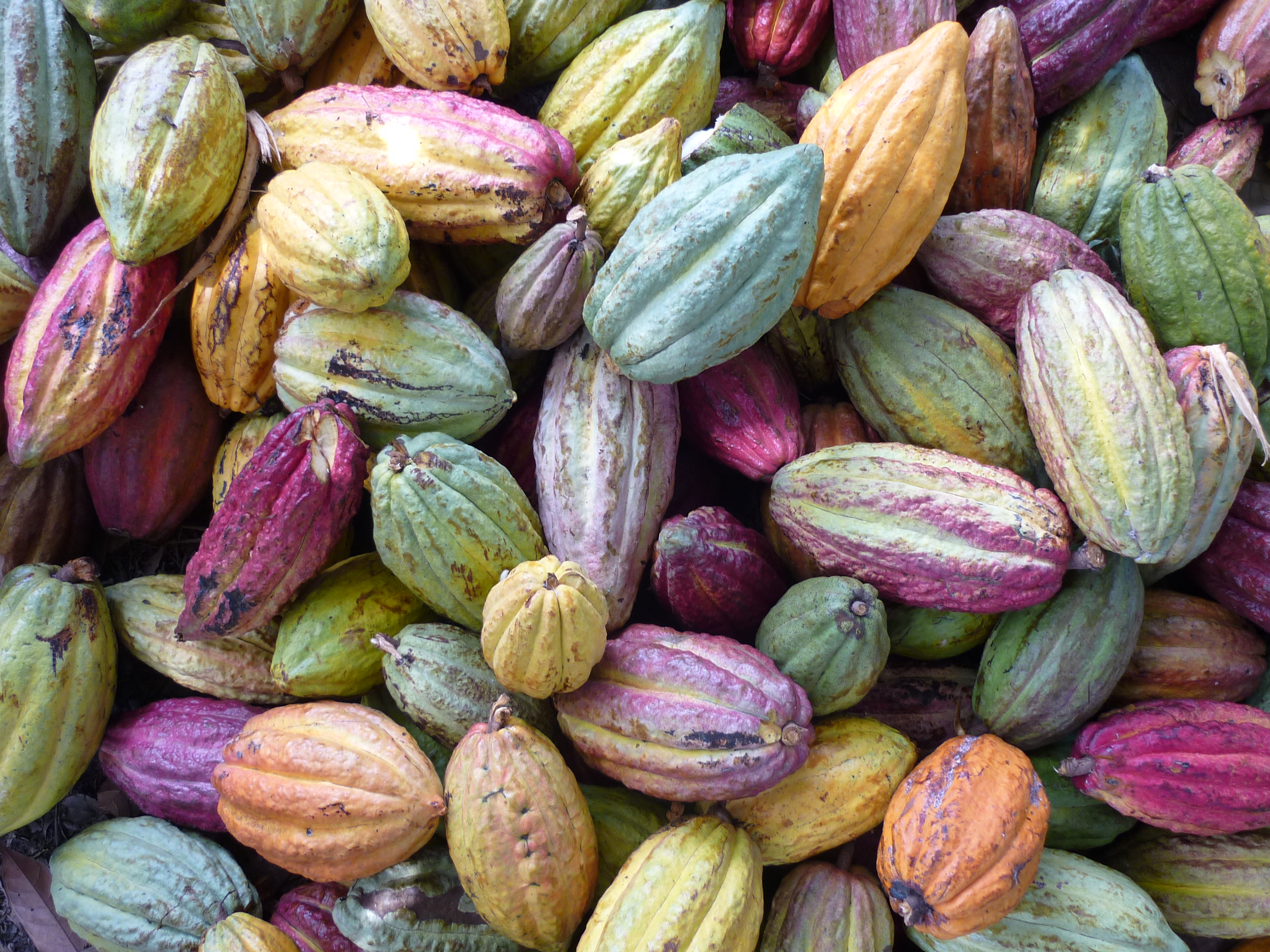
Cocoa pods (fruits) in Madagascar

Ambanja is a district in northern Madagascar. It is a part of Diana Region and borders the districts of Ambilobe to the east, Bealanana to the south and Analalava to the south-west. The area is 5,999.72 km^{2} (2,317 sq mi) and the population was estimated at 190,435 in 2013.

== Economy ==
The district is the main producer of Cocoa beans (valley of the Sambirano River) in Madagascar.

== Communes ==
The district is further divided into 18 communes:

- Ambalahonko
- Ambanja
- Ambodimanga
- Ambohimarina
- Ankatafa
- Ankingameloko
- Anorotsangana
- Antafiambotry
- Antranokarany
- Antsakoamanondro
- Antsatsaka
- Antsirabe
- Bemanevika Haut Sambirano
- Bemaneviky Ouest
- Djangoa
- Maherivaratra
- Marotolana
- Marovato

== Protected areas ==
- Nosy Antsoha protected harmonious seascape
- Ampasindava Protected Harmonious Landscape
- Part of Galoko-Kalobinono protected harmonious landscape
- Part of Manongarivo special reserve
- Part of Tsaratanana national park
- Ankivonjy protected harmonious seascape
