= Marovato, Ambanja =

Marovato
- Location in Madagascar
- Coordinates: 13°54′S 48°44′E
- Country: Madagascar
- Region: Diana
- District: Ambanja
- Elevation: 844 m (2,769 ft)

Population (2001)
  - Total: 16,130
- Time zone: UTC3 (EAT)

Marovato is a municipality (French: commune, Malagasy: kaominina) in Madagascar. It belongs to the district of Ambanja, which is a part of Diana Region. According to 2001 census the population of Marovato was 16,130.

Primary and junior level secondary education are available in town. The majority 99% of the population are farmers. The most important crop is coffee, while other important products are cocoa and rice. Services provide employment for 1% of the population.
