= Ambanja =

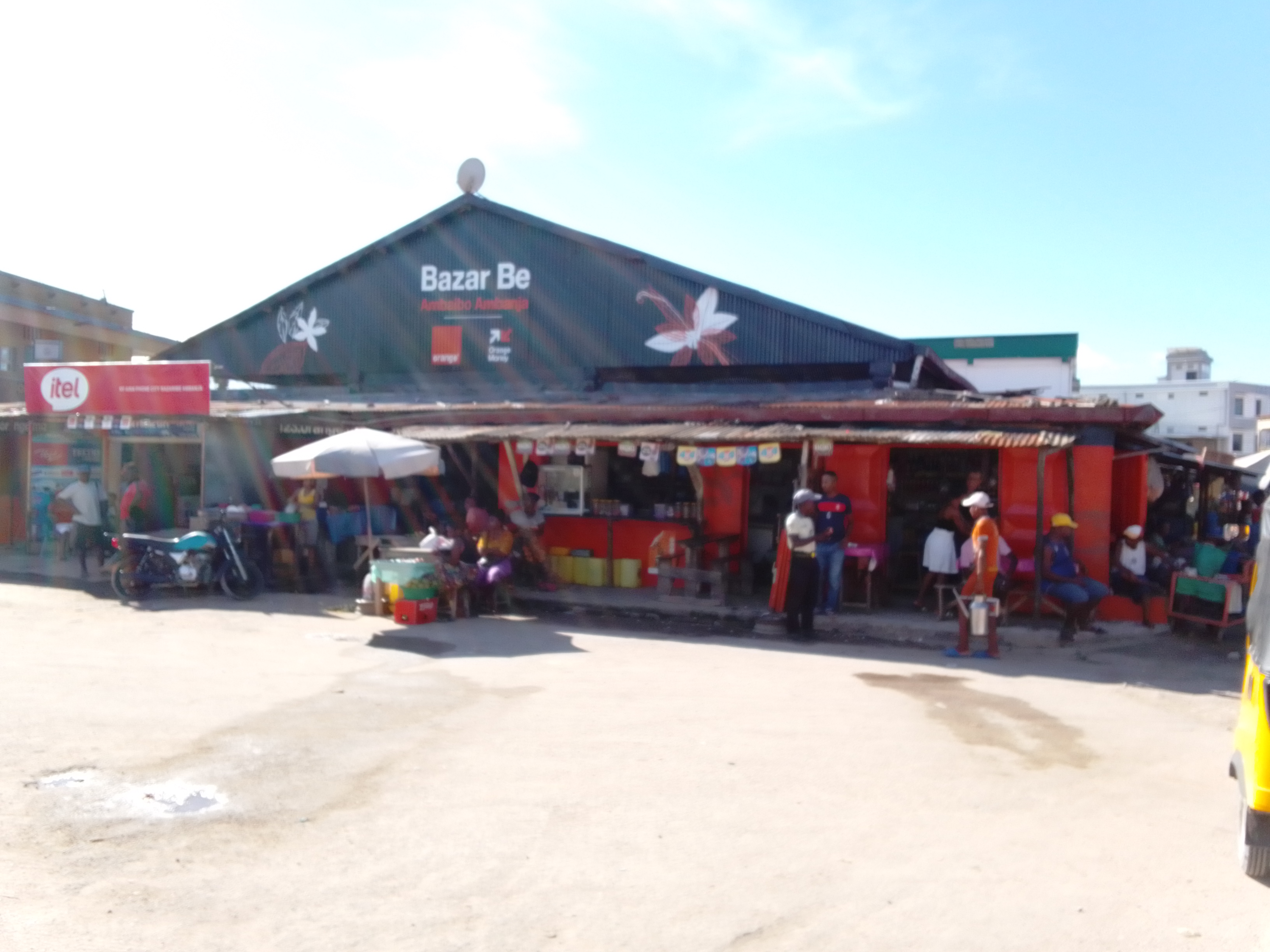
- the Bazary Be

- Location in Madagascar
- Coordinates: 13°40′43″S 48°27′8″E
- Country: Madagascar
- Region: Diana
- District: Ambanja

Area
  - Total: 80.9 km^{2} (31.2 sq mi)
- Elevation: 27 m (89 ft)

Population (2018)
  - Total: 60,321
  - Density: 746/km^{2} (1,930/sq mi)
- Time zone: UTC3 (EAT)
- Postal code: 203

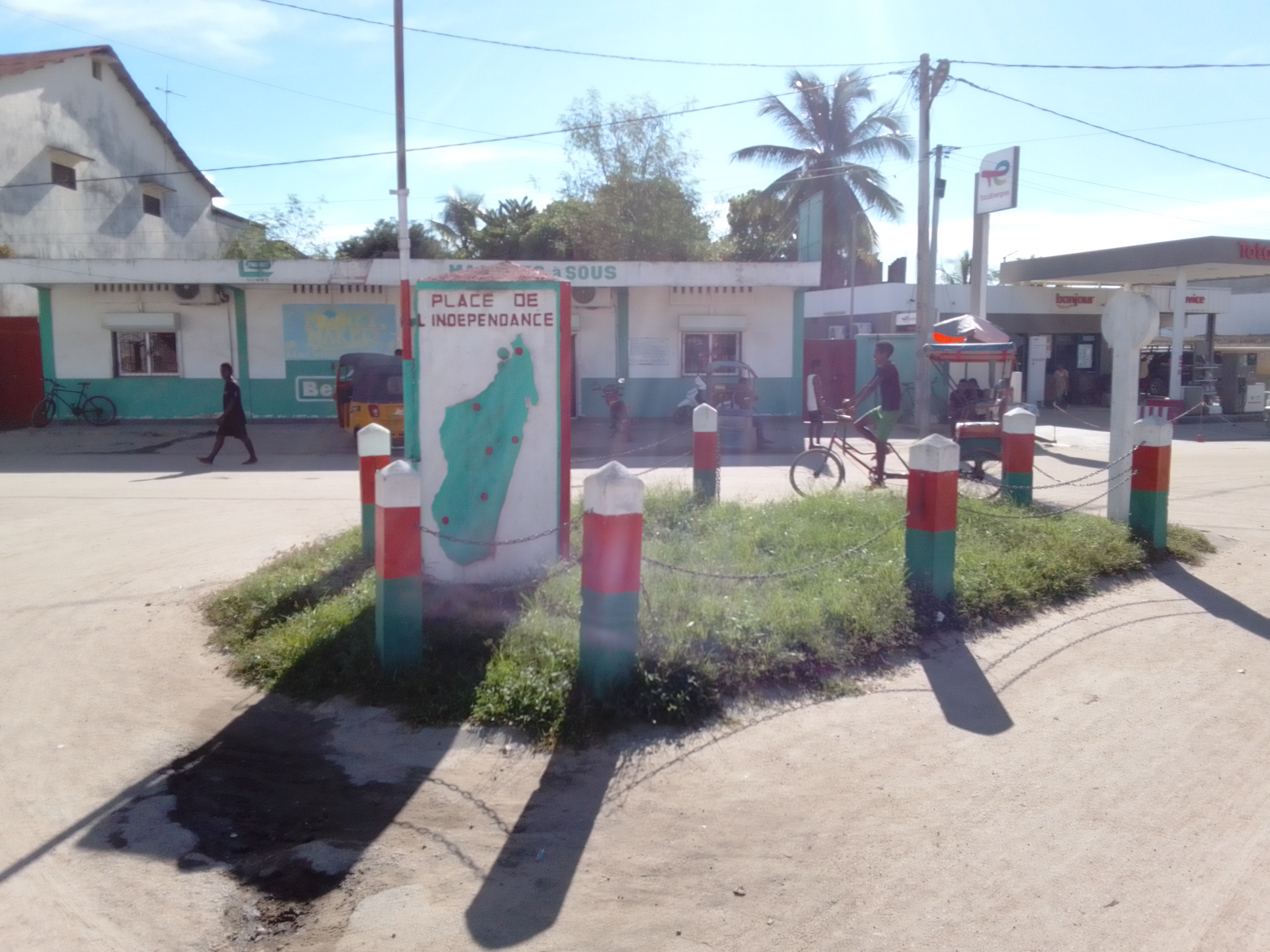
Place de l'indépendance Ambanja

Ambanja [amˈbandzə̥] is a city and commune in northern Madagascar. According to 2018 census the population of Ambanja was 60,321.

== Geography ==
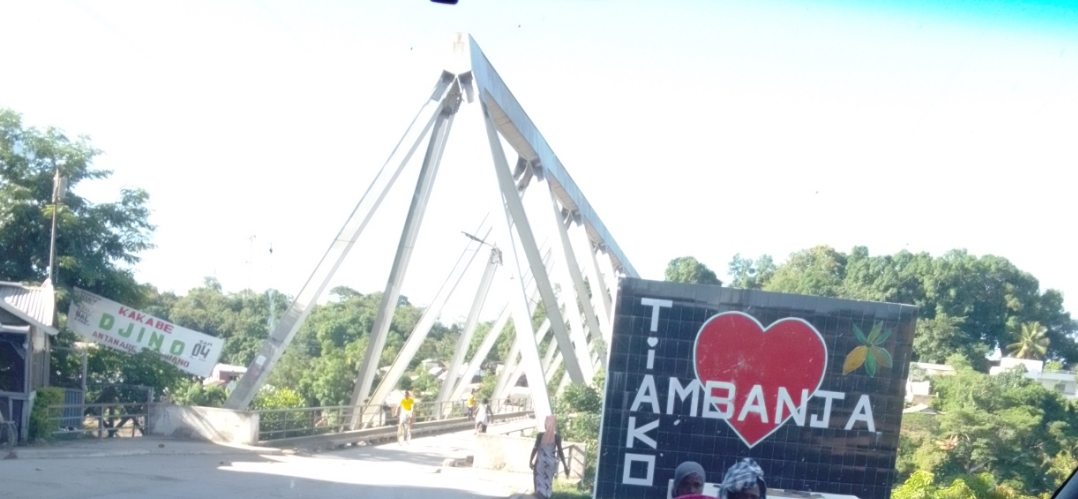
Bridge over the Sambirano

Ambanja is located on the northern berth of the Sambirano River and is crossed by the Route Nationale 6 (Antsiranana - Mahajanga and Antananarivo).

It is located at a road distance of 1 200 km north of Antananarivo and 237 km south-west of Antsiranana. The town belongs to the district of Ambanja, which is a part of Diana Region.

It is served by the local Ampampamena Airport and small, local, maritime harbour at Ankify that is the gate to the islands of Nosy Be and Nosy Komba

== Education ==
In addition to primary schooling the town offers secondary education at both junior and senior levels. The town has a permanent court and hospital. There is a technical & professional Lycee in Ambanja, and a school of agriculture.

The French international school is École Primaire Française d'Ambanja a.k.a. École primaire française Charles-Baudelaire.

== Religion ==
The town is seat of the Roman Catholic Diocese of Ambanja (Cathedral of St. Joseph).

== Economy ==
The majority 60% of the population are farmers, while an additional 2% receives their livelihood from raising livestock. The most important crop is cocoa, while other important products are coffee, rice and vanilla. Industry and services provide employment for 26% and 2% of the population, respectively. Additionally fishing employs 10% of the population.

== Nature ==
- Manongarivo Reserve is situated at 35 km from Ambanja.
- Mahamanina Falls - at 14 km

== Sports ==
- USSK Ambanja
