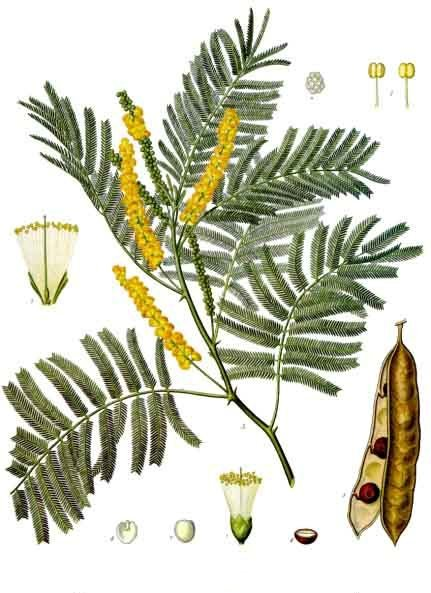

Conservation status
- Least Concern (IUCN 3.1)

Scientific classification
- Kingdom: Plantae
- Clade: Tracheophytes
- Clade: Angiosperms
- Clade: Eudicots
- Clade: Rosids
- Order: Fabales
- Family: Fabaceae
- Subfamily: Caesalpinioideae
- Clade: Mimosoid clade
- Genus: Senegalia
- Species: S. catechu

Binomial name
- Senegalia catechu (L.f.) P.J.H.Hurter & Mabb.

Varieties
- Senegalia catechu var. catechu (L.f.) P.J.H.Hurter & Mabb.; Senegalia catechu var. sundra (L.f.) Willd.
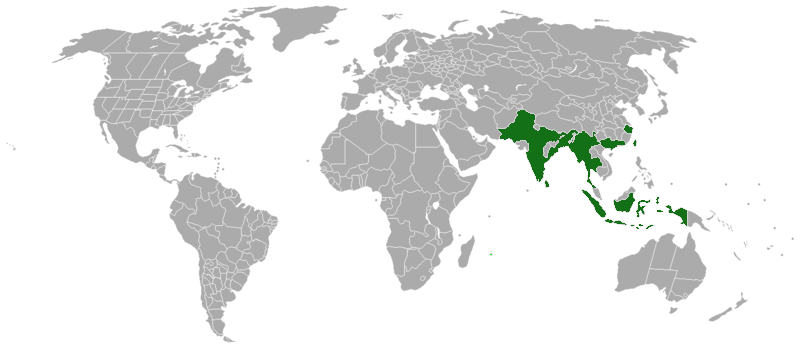
- Range of Senegalia catechu

Synonyms
- Acacia catechu (L.) Willd., Oliv.; Acacia catechu (L.f.) Willd. var. catechuoides (Roxb.)Prain; Acacia catechuoides (Roxb.) Benth.; Acacia sundra (Roxb.) Bedd.; Acacia wallichiana DC.; Mimosa catechu L.f.; Mimosa catechuoides Roxb.

= Senegalia catechu =

Species of legume

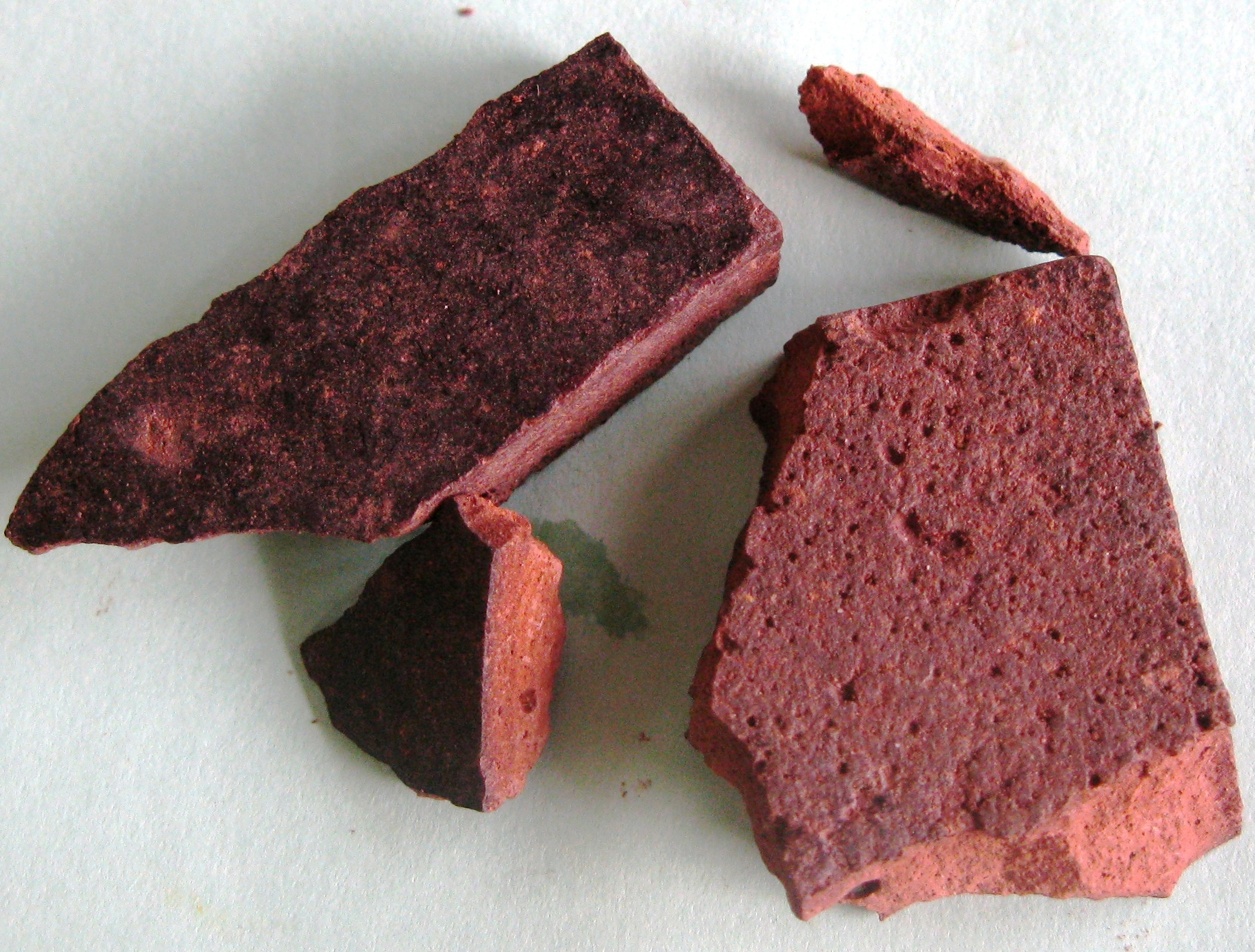
Catechu

Senegalia catechu, previously known as Acacia catechu, is a deciduous, thorny tree which grows up to 15 m (50 ft) in height. The plant is called kachu in Malay; the Malay name was Latinized to "catechu" in Linnaean taxonomy, as the species from which the extracts cutch and catechu are derived. Other common names for it include kher, catechu, cachou, cutchtree, black cutch, and black catechu.

Senegalia catechu is native to South Asia and Southeast Asia, including the Indian subcontinent, Myanmar, Cambodia and China (Yunnan).

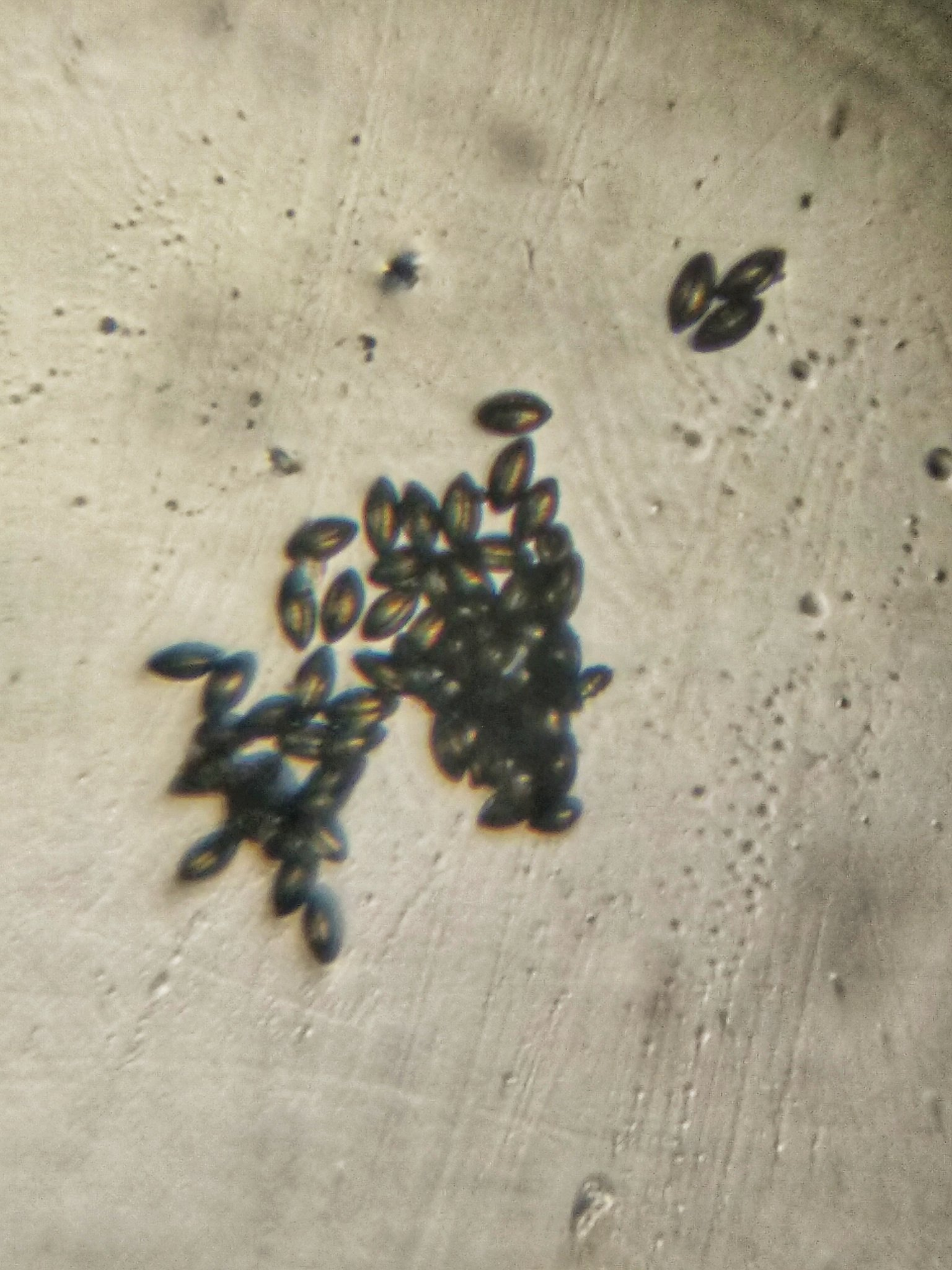
Pollen from Senegalia catechu

Through derivatives of the flavanols in its extracts, the species has lent its name to the important catechins, catechols and catecholamines of chemistry and biology.

== Uses ==
=== Food ===
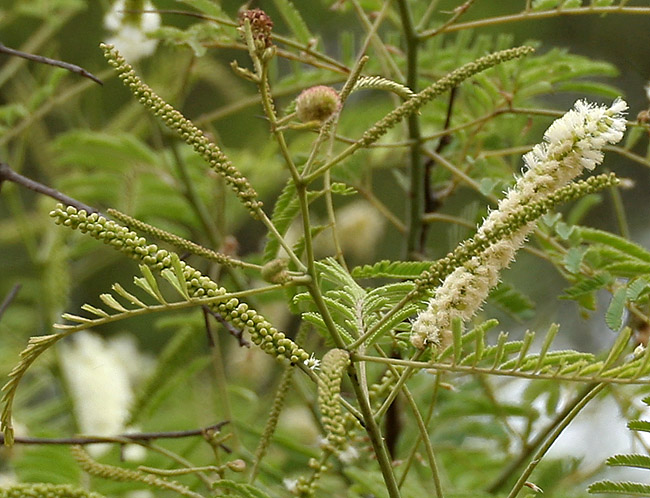
Senegalia catechu flowers

The tree's seeds are a good source of protein. Kattha (catechu), an extract of its heartwood, gives a characteristic flavor and red color to paan, a traditional Indian and Southeast Asian method for chewing betel leaf (Piper betle) with areca nut and slaked lime paste.

=== Fodder ===
Branches of the tree are quite often cut for goat fodder and are sometimes fed to cattle.

=== Folk medicine ===
The heartwood, bark, and wood extract (called catechu) are used in traditional medicine. The concentrated aqueous extract, known as khayer gum or cutch, is astringent.

=== Wood ===
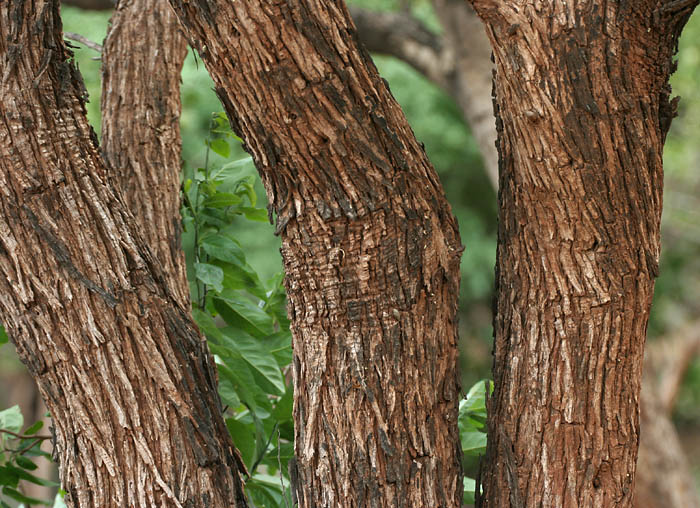
Senegalia catechu trunks

The tree is often planted for use as firewood and charcoal and its wood is highly valued for furniture and tools. The wood has a density of about 0.88 g/cm^{3}.

=== Other uses ===
Its heartwood extract is used in dyeing and leather tanning, as a preservative for fishing nets, and as a viscosity regulator for oil drilling. Its flowers are a good source of nectar and pollen for bees.

== Cultivation ==
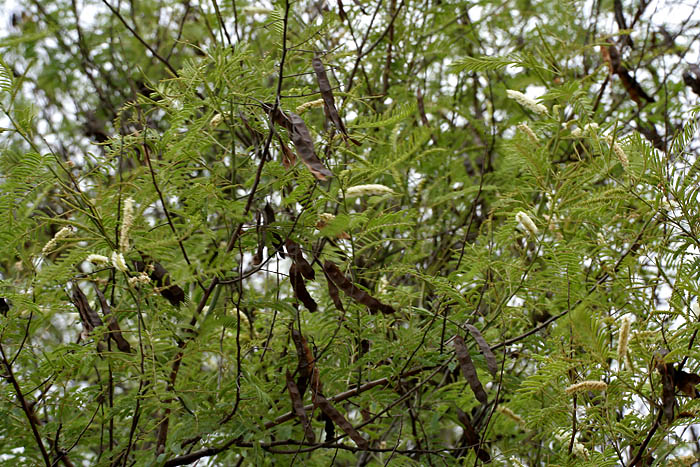
Senegalia catechu pods

The tree can be propagated by planting its seeds, which are soaked in hot water first. After about six months in a nursery, the seedlings can be planted in the field.

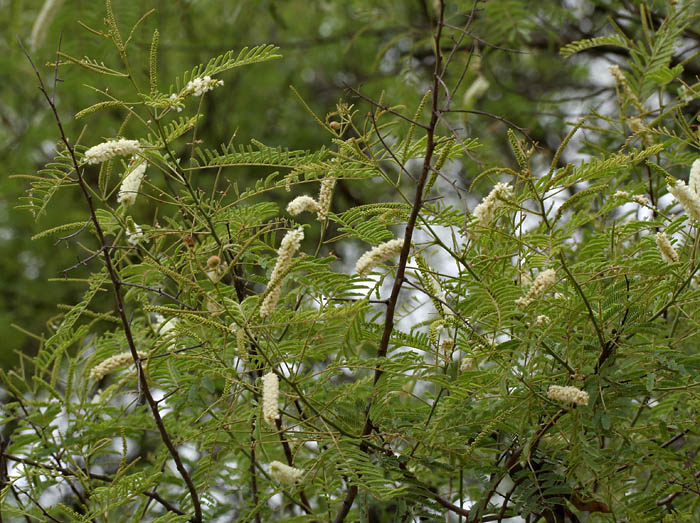

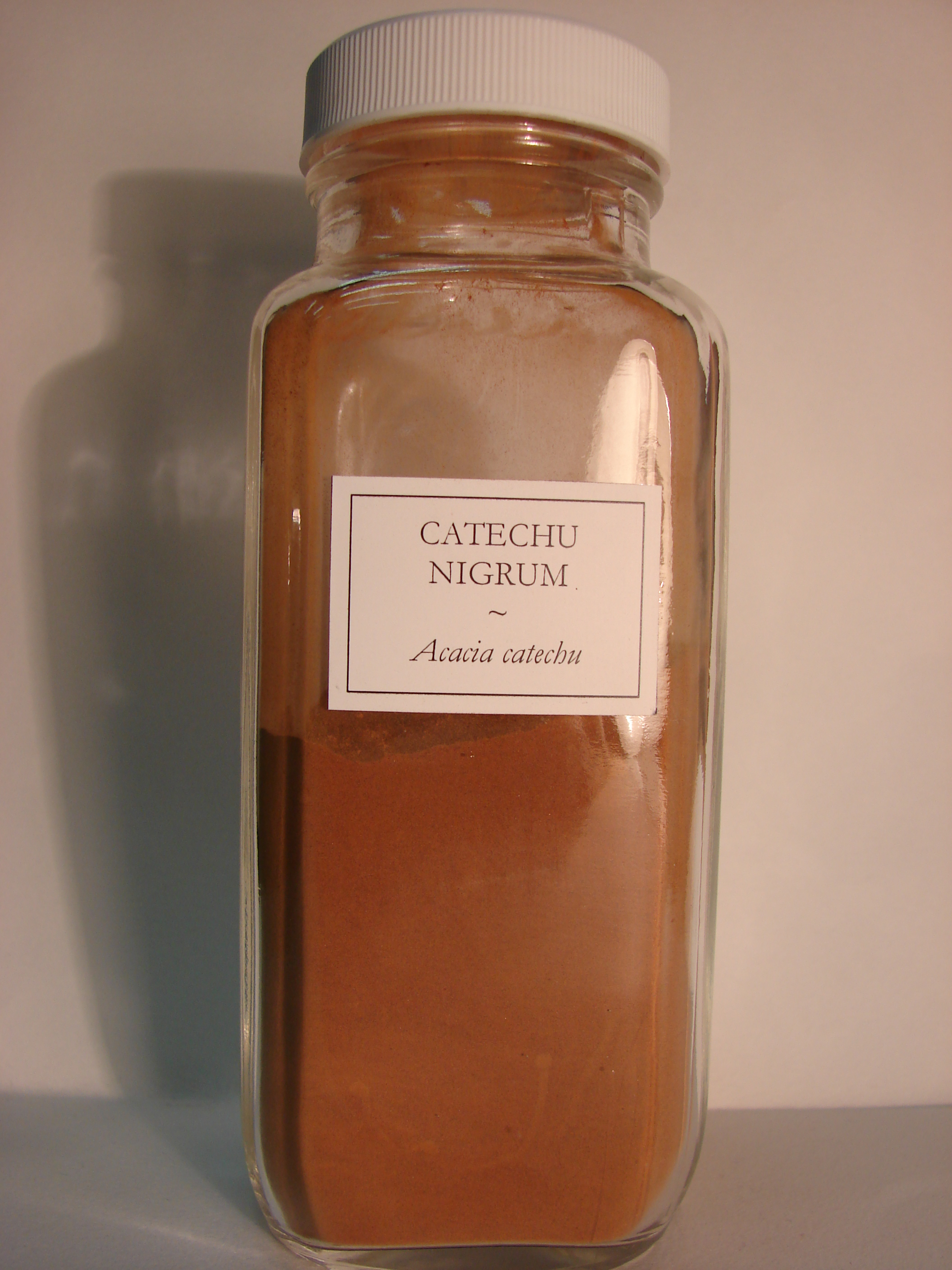

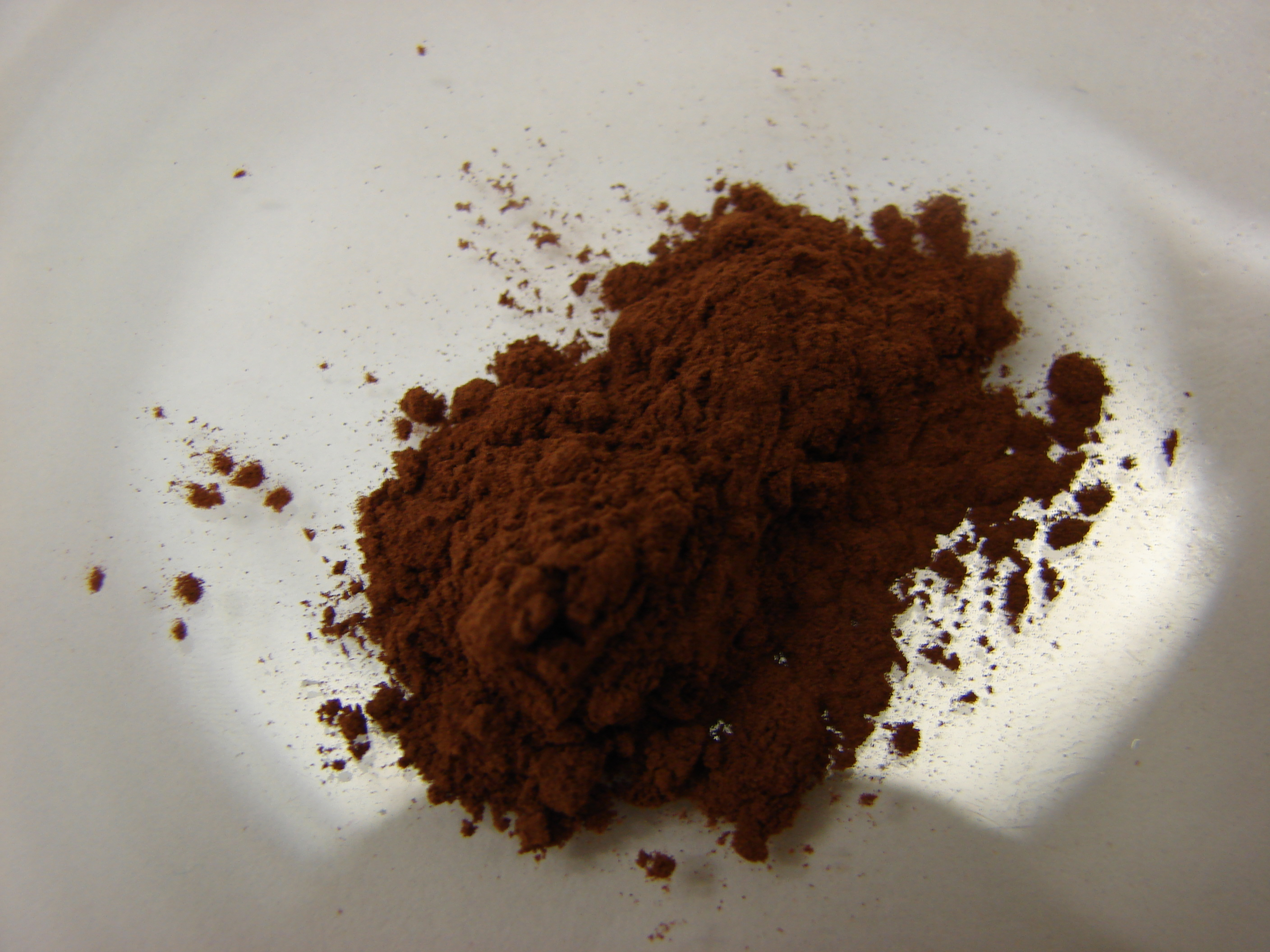

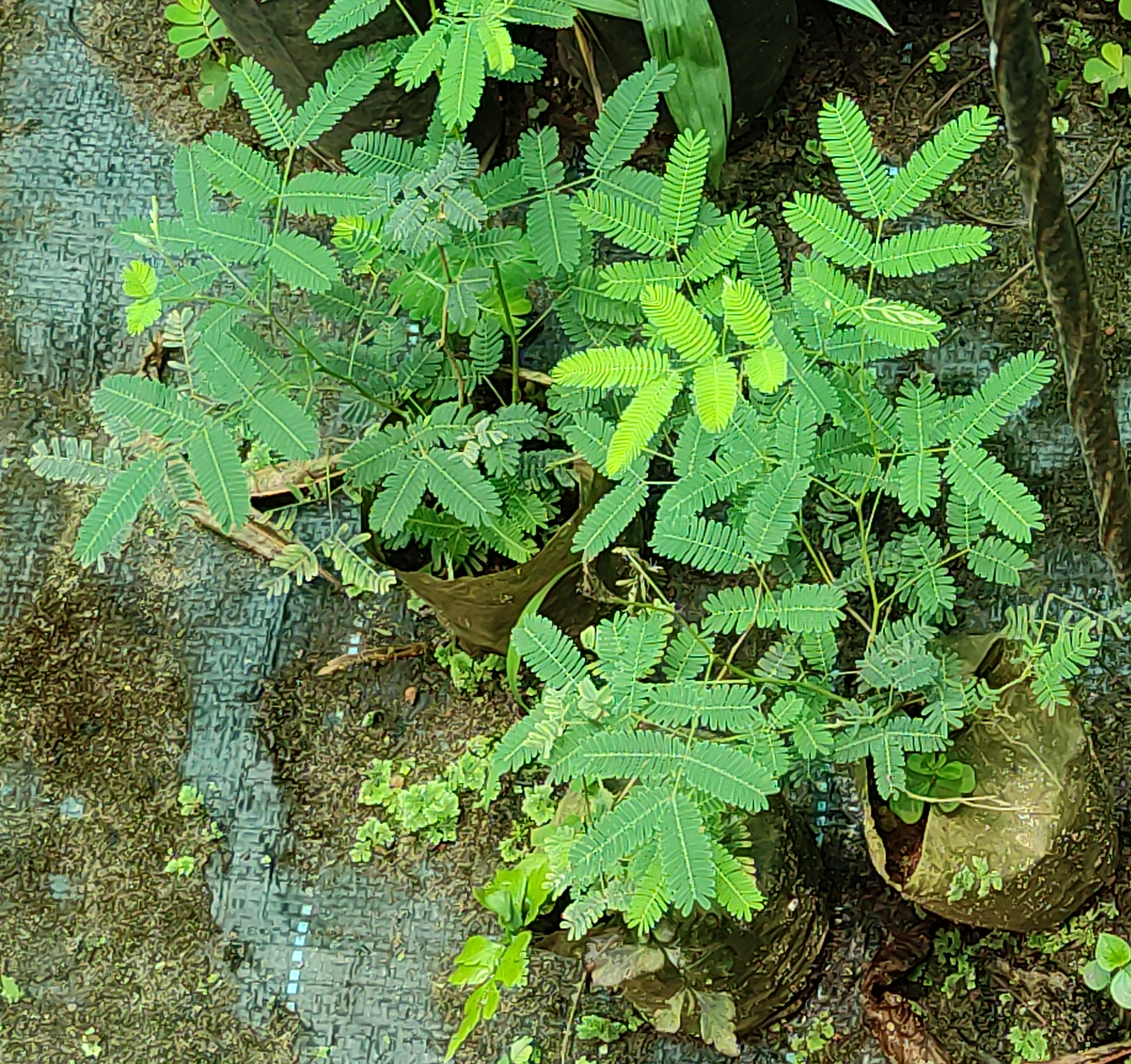
Plantlings

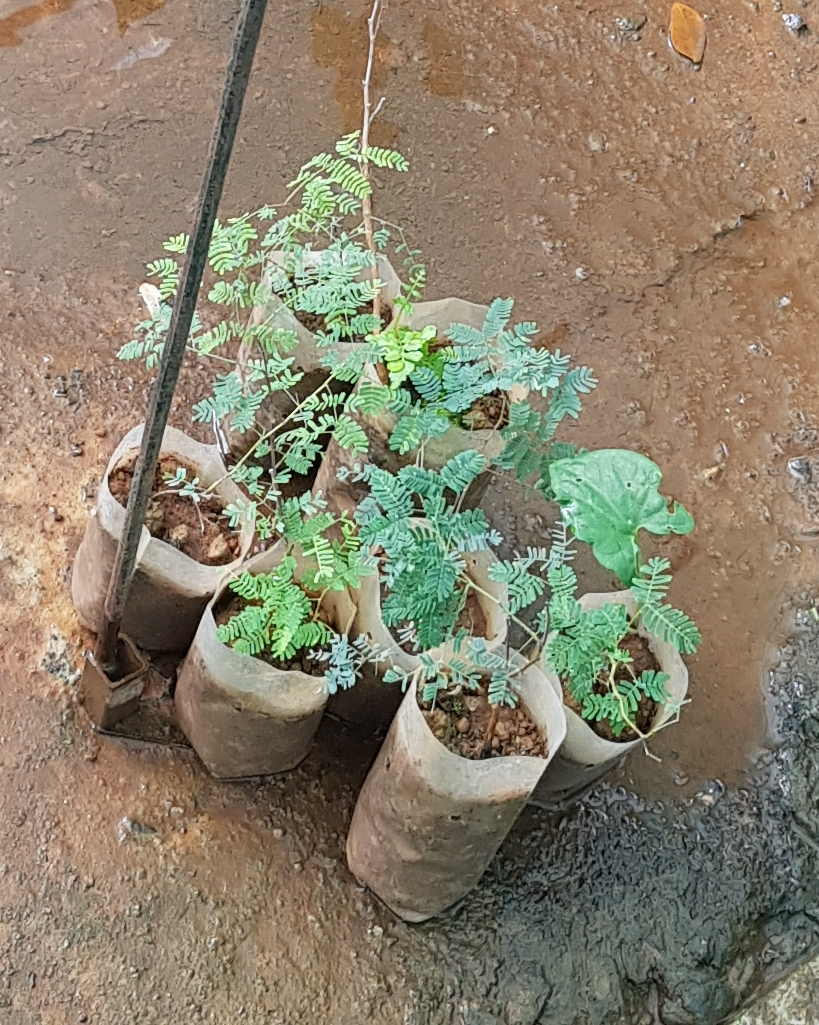
Senegalia catechu plantlings

== See also ==
- Arid Forest Research Institute
- Catechu
- Catechin
- Pyrocatechol
